= Decipherment of rongorongo =

Attempts to understand Easter Island script

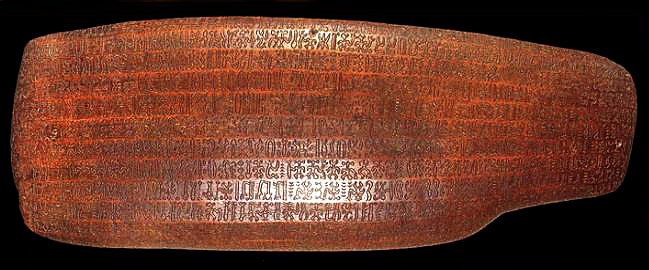
Tablet B Aruku kurenga, verso. One of four texts which provided the Jaussen list, the first attempt at decipherment. Made of Pacific rosewood, mid-nineteenth century, Easter Island. (Collection of the SS.CC., Rome)

There have been numerous attempts to decipher the rongorongo script of Easter Island since its discovery in the late nineteenth century. As with most undeciphered scripts, many of the proposals have been fanciful. Apart from a portion of one tablet which has been shown to deal with a lunar calendar, none of the texts are understood, and even the calendar cannot actually be read. The evidence is weak that rongorongo directly represents the Rapa Nui language – that is, that it is a true writing system – and oral accounts report that experts in one category of tablet were unable to read other tablets, suggesting either that rongorongo is not a unified system, or that it is proto-writing that requires the reader to already know the text. Assuming that rongorongo is writing, there are three serious obstacles to decipherment: the small number of remaining texts, comprising only 15,000 legible glyphs; the lack of context in which to interpret the texts, such as illustrations or parallel texts which can be read; and the fact that the modern Rapa Nui language is heavily mixed with Tahitian and is unlikely to closely reflect the language of the tablets—especially if they record a specialized register such as incantations—while the few remaining examples of the old language are heavily restricted in genre and may not correspond well to the tablets either.

Since a proposal by Butinov and Knorozov in the 1950s, the majority of philologists, linguists and cultural historians have taken the line that rongorongo was not true writing but proto-writing, that is, an ideographic- and rebus-based mnemonic device, such as the Dongba script of the Nakhi people, which would in all likelihood make it impossible to decipher. This skepticism is justified not only by the failure of the numerous attempts at decipherment, but by the extreme rarity of independent writing systems around the world. Of those who have attempted to decipher rongorongo as a true writing system, the vast majority have assumed it was logographic, a few that it was syllabic or mixed. Statistically, it appears to have been compatible with neither a pure logography nor a pure syllabary. The topic of the texts is unknown; various investigators have speculated they cover genealogy, navigation, astronomy, or agriculture. Oral history suggests that only a small elite were ever literate, and that the tablets were considered sacred.

== Accounts from Easter Island ==
In the late 19th century, within a few years to decades of the destruction of Easter Island society by slave raiding and introduced epidemics, two amateur investigators recorded readings and recitations of rongorongo tablets by Easter Islanders. Both accounts were compromised at best, and are often taken to be worthless, but they are the only accounts from people who may have been familiar with the script first-hand.

=== Jaussen ===
In 1868 the Bishop of Tahiti, Florentin-Étienne Jaussen, received a gift from recent converts on Easter Island: a long cord of human hair wound around a discarded rongorongo tablet. (Note: This was Text D Échancrée ("notched")) He immediately recognized the importance of the tablet, and asked Father Hippolyte Roussel on Easter Island to collect more tablets and to find islanders capable of reading them. Roussel was able to acquire only a few additional tablets, and he could find no-one to read them, but the next year in Tahiti Jaussen found a laborer from Easter Island, Metoro Tauꞌa Ure, who was said to know the inscriptions "by heart".

Sometime between 1869 and 1874, Jaussen worked with Metoro to decipher four of the tablets in his possession: A Tahua, B Aruku kurenga, C Mamari, and E Keiti. (Note: Fischer believes he can date these sessions to August 1873) A list of the glyphs they identified was published posthumously, along with a complete account of the chants for A and B. This is the famous Jaussen list. Though at first taken for a Rosetta Stone of rongorongo, it has not led to an understanding of the script. It has been criticized for, among other inadequacies, glossing five glyphs as "porcelain", a material not found on Easter Island. However, this is a mistranslation: Jaussen glossed the five glyphs as porcelaine, French for both "cowrie" and the cowrie-like Chinese ceramic which is called porcelain in English. Jaussen's Rapanui gloss, pure, means specifically "cowrie". (Note: Englert (1993): "pure: concha marina (Cypraea caput draconis)" [pure: a sea shell (Cypraea caputdraconis)])

Almost a century later, Thomas Barthel published some of Jaussen's notes. He compared Metoro's chants with parallel passages in other tablets and discovered that Metoro had read the lines of Keiti forwards on the reverse but backwards on the obverse. Jacques Guy found that Metoro had also read the lunar calendar in Mamari backwards, and failed to recognize the "very obvious" pictogram of the full moon within it, demonstrating a lack of any understanding of the contents of the tablets.

=== Thomson ===
William J. Thomson, paymaster on the USS Mohican, spent twelve days on Easter Island from 19 December to 30 December 1886, during which time he made an impressive number of observations, including some which are of interest for the decipherment of the rongorongo.

==== Ancient calendar ====
Among the ethnographic data Thomson collected were the names of the nights of the lunar month and of the months of the year. This is key to interpreting the single identifiable sequence of rongorongo, and is notable in that it contains thirteen months; other sources mention only twelve. Métraux criticizes Thomson for translating Anakena as August when in 1869 Roussel identified it as July, and Barthel restricts his work to Métraux and Englert, because they are in agreement while "Thomson's list is off by one month". However, Guy calculated the dates of the new moon for years 1885 to 1887 and showed that Thomson's list fit the phases of the moon for 1886. He concluded that the ancient Rapanui used a lunisolar calendar with kotuti as its embolismic month (its "leap month"), and that Thomson chanced to land on Easter Island in a year with a leap month.

==== Ure Vaꞌe Iko's recitations ====
Thomson was told of an old man called Ure Vaꞌe Iko who "professes to have been under instructions in the art of hieroglyphic reading at the time of the Peruvian raids, and claims to understand most of the characters". He had been the steward of King Ngaꞌara, the last king said to have had knowledge of writing, and although he was not able to write himself, he knew many of the rongorongo chants and was able to read at least one memorized text. When Thomson plied him with gifts and money to read the two tablets he had purchased, Ure "declined most positively to ruin his chances for salvation by doing what his Christian instructors had forbidden" and finally fled. However, Thomson had taken photographs of Jaussen's tablets when the USS Mohican was in Tahiti, and he eventually cajoled Ure into reading from those photographs. The English-Tahitian landowner Alexander Salmon took down Ure's dictation, which he later translated into English, for the following tablets:

Ure Vaꞌe Iko's readings
Recitation	Corresponding tablet
Apai	E (Keiti)
Atua Matariri (Note: "The Atua Matariri text per Salmon". and "as corrected by Métraux". Archived from the original on 2008-05-16.)	R (Small Washington) ? (Note: These chants are attributed to texts R and S in the published article. However, this may be an error: Thomson reported that Ure Vae Iko refused to chant from the original tablets and would use only photographs, but Thompson had just acquired R and S on Easter Island and had had no time to have photographs prepared. The photos Thompson published in 1891, besides R and S, were of B, C, D, E, and H, so it's possible the chants identified with R and S may have actually been of B or H, assuming the other chants were attributed properly.)
Eaha to ran ariiki Kete	S (Great Washington) ?
Ka ihi uiga	D (Échancrée)
Ate-a-renga-hokau iti poheraa	C (Mamari)

Salmon's Rapanui was not fluent, and apart from Atua Matariri, which is almost entirely composed of proper names, his English translations do not match what he transcribed of Ure's readings. The readings themselves, seemingly reliable although difficult to interpret at first, become clearly ridiculous towards the end. The last recitation, for instance, which has been accepted as a love song on the strength of Salmon's English translation, is interspersed with Tahitian phrases, including words of European origin, such as "the French flag" (te riva forani) and "give money for revealing [this]" (horoa moni e fahiti), which would not be expected on a pre-contact text. (Note: In Tahitian orthography, these are te reva farāni and hōroꞌa moni e faꞌahiti. Note that moni comes from English money, and that /f/ does not exist in the Rapanui language. Fischer says: Ure's so-called "Love Song" (Thomson, 1889:526), though an interesting example of a typical popular song on Rapanui in the 1880s, among Routledge's informants nearly 30 years later "was laughed out of court as being merely a love-song which everyone knew" (Routledge, 1919:248). Once again Ure's text dismisses itself because of its recent Tahitianisms: te riva forani, moni, and fahiti.) The very title is a mixture of Rapanui and Tahitian: poheraꞌa is Tahitian for "death"; the Rapanui word is matenga. Ure was an unwilling informant: even with duress, Thomson was only able to gain his cooperation with "the cup that cheers" (that is, rum):

Finally [Ure] took to the hills with the determination to remain in hiding until after the departure of the Mohican. [U]nscrupulous strategy was the only resource after fair means had failed. [When he] sought the shelter of his own home on [a] rough night [we] took charge of the establishment. When he found escape impossible he became sullen, and refused to look at or touch a tablet [but agreed to] relate some of the ancient traditions. [C]ertain stimulants which had been provided for such an emergency were produced, and [...] as the night grew old and the narrator weary, he was included as the "cup that cheers" made its occasional rounds. [A]t an auspicious moment the photographs of the tablets owned by the bishop were produced for inspection. [...] The photographs were recognized immediately, and the appropriate legend related with fluency and without hesitation from beginning to end.

— Thomson 1891:515

Nonetheless, while no one has succeeded in correlating Ure's readings with the rongorongo texts, they may yet have value for decipherment. The first two recitations, Apai and Atua Matariri, are not corrupted with Tahitian. The verses of Atua Matariri are of the form X ki ꞌai ki roto Y, ka pû te Z "X by copulating with Y produced Z" (Note: Guy proposed a different translation by assuming that the particle ka which Métraux took to be the past tense on produced is the imperative (the modern Rapa Nui particle for past tense is ku); so that the formula X ki ꞌai ki roto Y, ka pû te Z would be better translated as X, by mounting into Y, let Z come forth.. However, ka is not only an imperative particle, but is still used in modern Rapa Nui to express temporal contiguity between two actions. For example, in subordinate clauses: He uꞌi atu, ka pû te manu taiko ("She saw a taiko bird come by").):

"Moon (?) by copulating with Darkness (?) produced Sun" (verse 25),
"Killing by copulating with Flat-one-of-the-white-tail (the sting ray) produced the shark" (verse 28),
"Stinging-fly by copulating with Swarm-of-flies produced the fly" (verse 16).

These verses have generally been interpreted as creation chants, with various beings begetting additional beings, as is typical of Polynesian cosmogonies. Some verses of Atua Matariri reference myths from other parts of Polynesia, while others refer to Easter Island's own mythology. For example:

"Tiki-the-lord by copulating with Running-and-flowing-down [water] produced the rockfish" (verse 30),
"Tiki-the-lord by copulating with Hina-the-heaped-up produced Hina-kauhara" (verse 31),
"Tiki-the-lord by copulating with Stone produced burning-red-meat (?)" (verse 32).

These verses summarize a myth about Makemake (the Easter Island equivalent to Polynesian Tāne and Tiki) where the god attempts to create mankind by copulating with various objects, including a water-filled gourd, stones and a heap of soil. A close parallel was recorded in a Mangarevan chant that lists twenty procreations of Tiki:

"Tiki procreated with the candlenut to produce offspring, hence the milky sap, oh".

Guy offered an alternative interpretation by noting that the phrasing is similar to the way compound Chinese characters are described. For example, the composition of the Chinese character 銅 tóng "copper" may be described as "add 同 tóng to 金 jīn to make 銅 tóng" (meaning "add Together to Metal to make Copper"), which is nonsense when taken literally. (Note: An example of a superficially nonsensical Chinese mnemonic is illustrated at biangbiang noodles.) He hypothesizes that the Atua Matariri chant which Ure had heard in his youth, although unconnected to the particular tablet for which he recited it, was a genuine rongorongo chant: A mnemonic which taught students how the glyphs were composed.

== Fanciful decipherments ==
Since the late nineteenth century, there has been all manner of speculation about rongorongo. Most remained obscure, but a few attracted considerable attention.

In 1892 the Australian pediatrician Alan Carroll published a fanciful translation, based on the idea that the texts were written by an extinct "Long-Ear" population of Easter Island in a diverse mixture of Quechua and other languages of Peru and Mesoamerica. Perhaps due to the cost of casting special type for rongorongo, no method, analysis, or sound values of the individual glyphs were ever published. Carroll continued to publish short communications in Science of Man, the journal of the (Royal) Anthropological Society of Australasia until 1908. Carroll had himself founded the society, which is "nowadays seen as forming part of the 'lunatic fringe'."

In 1932 the Hungarian Vilmos Hevesy (Guillaume de Hevesy) published an article claiming a relationship between rongorongo and the Indus Valley script, based on superficial similarities of form. This was not a new idea, but was now presented to the French Academy of Inscriptions and Literature by the French Sinologist Paul Pelliot and picked up by the press. Due to the lack of an accessible rongorongo corpus for comparison, it was not apparent that several of the rongorongo glyphs illustrated in Hevesy's publications were spurious. Despite the fact that both scripts were undeciphered (as they are to this day), separated by half the world and half of history (19,000 km (12,000 mi) and 4000 years), and had no known intermediate stages, Hevesy's ideas were taken seriously enough in academic circles to prompt a 1934 Franco-Belgian expedition to Easter Island led by Lavachery and Métraux to debunk them (Métraux 1939). The Indus Valley connection was published as late as 1938 in such respected anthropological journals as Man.

At least a score of decipherments have been claimed since then, none of which have been accepted by other rongorongo epigraphers. For instance, ethnographer Irina Fedorova published purported translations of the two St Petersburg tablets and portions of four others. More rigorous than most attempts, she restricts each glyph to a single logographic reading. However, the results make little sense as texts. For example, tablet P begins (with each rongorongo ligature set off with a comma in the translation):

he cut a rangi sugarcane, a tara yam, he cut lots of taro, of stalks (?), he cut a yam, he harvested, he cut a yam, he cut, he pulled up, he cut a honui, he cut a sugarcane, he cut, he harvested, he took, a kihi, he chose a kihi, he took a kihi ...

— Text P, recto, line 1 (Note: As translated by Pozdniakov (1996): coupé canne à sucre rangi, igname tara, beaucoup coupé taro, des tiges (?), coupé igname, récolté, coupé igname, coupé, tiré, coupé honui, coupé canne à sucre, coupé, récolté, pris, kihi, choisi kihi, pris kihi... — Pr1 récolté igname, poporo, gourde, tiré igname, coupé, coupé une plante, coupé une plante, igname, coupé banane, récolté canne à sucre, coupé taro, coupé igname kahu, igname, igname, igname... — Pv11 racine, racine, racine, racine, racine, racine (c'est-à-dire beaucoup de racines), tubercule, pris, coupé tubercule de patate, déterré des pousses d'igname, tubercule d'igname, tubercule de patate, tubercule, ... — Cr7)

and continues in this vein to the end:

he harvested a yam, a poporo, a calabash, he pulled up a yam, he cut, he cut one plant, he cut one plant, a yam, he cut a banana, he harvested a sugarcane, he cut a taro, he cut a kahu yam, a yam, a yam ...

— Text P, verso, line 11

The other texts are similar. For example, the Mamari calendar makes no mention of time or the moon in Fedorova's account:

a root, a root, a root, a root, a root, a root [that is, a lot of roots], a tuber, he took, he cut a potato tuber, he dug up yam shoots, a yam tuber, a potato tuber, a tuber ...

— Text C, recto, line 7

which even Fedorova characterized as "worthy of a maniac".

Moreover, the allographs detected by Pozdniakov are given different readings by Fedorova, so that, for example, otherwise parallel texts repeatedly substitute the purported verb maꞌu "take" for the purported noun tonga "a kind of yam". (Pozdniakov has demonstrated that these are graphic variants of the same glyph.) As it was, Fedorova's catalog consisted of only 130 glyphs; Pozdniakov's additional allography would have reduced that number and made her interpretation even more repetitive. Such extreme repetition is a problem with all attempts to read rongorongo as a logographic script.

Many recent scholars are of the opinion that, while many researchers have made modest incremental contributions to the understanding of rongorongo, notably Kudrjavtsev et al., Butinov and Knorozov, and Thomas Barthel, the attempts at actual decipherment, such as those of Fedorova here or of Fischer below, "are not accompanied by the least justification". (Note: [I]ls ne sont pas accompagnés de la moindre justification.) All fail the key test of decipherment: a meaningful application to novel texts and patterns.

== Harrison ==
Compound 380.1.3 repeated three times on Gr4 (1st, 3rd, & 5th glyphs)

James Park Harrison, a council member of the Anthropological Institute of Great Britain and Ireland, noticed that lines Gr3–7 of the Small Santiago tablet featured a compound glyph, 380.1.3 (a sitting figure 380 holding a rod 1 with a line of chevrons (a garland?) 3), repeated 31 times, each time followed by one to half a dozen glyphs before its next occurrence. He believed that this broke the text into sections containing the names of chiefs. Barthel later found this pattern on tablet K, which is a paraphrase of Gr (in many of the K sequences the compound is reduced to 380.1), as well as on A, where it sometimes appears as 380.1.3 and sometimes as 380.1; on C, E, and S as 380.1; and, with the variant 380.1.52, on N. In places it appears abbreviated as 1.3 or 1.52, without the human figure, but parallels in the texts suggest these have the same separating function. Barthel saw the sequence 380.1 as a tangata rongorongo (rongorongo expert) holding an inscribed staff like the Santiago Staff.

== Kudrjavtsev et al. ==
During World War II, a small group of students in Saint Petersburg (then Leningrad), Boris Kudrjavtsev, Valeri Chernushkov, and Oleg Klitin, became interested in tablets P, and Q, which they saw on display at the Museum of Ethnology and Anthropology. They discovered that they bore, with minor variation, the same text, which they later found on tablet H as well:

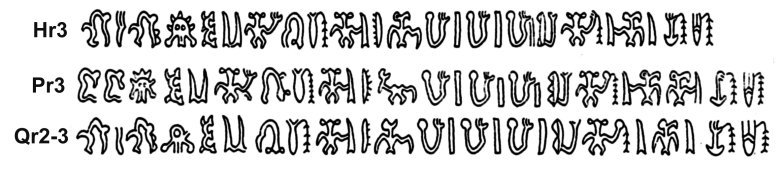

Parallel texts: A short excerpt of tablets H, P, and Q

Barthel would later call this the "Grand Tradition", though its contents remain unknown.

The group later noticed that tablet K was a close paraphrase of the recto of G. Kudrjavtsev wrote up their findings, which were published posthumously. Numerous other parallel, though shorter, sequences have since been identified through statistical analysis, with texts N and R found to be composed almost entirely of phrases shared with other tablets, though not in the same order.

Identifying such shared phrasing was one of the first steps in unraveling the structure of the script, as it is the best way to detect ligatures and allographs, and thus to establish the inventory of rongorongo glyphs.

Ligatures: Parallel texts Pr4–5 (top) and Hr5 (bottom) show that a figure (glyph 200) holding an object (glyphs 8, 1, and 9) in P may be fused into a ligature in H, where the object replaces either the figure's head or its hand. (Elsewhere in these texts, animal figures are reduced to a distinctive feature such as a head or arm when they fuse with a preceding glyph.) Here also are the two hand shapes (glyphs 6 and 64) which would later be established as allographs. Three of the four human and turtle figures at left have arm ligatures with an orb (glyph 62), which Pozdniakov found often marks a phrase boundary.

== Butinov and Knorozov ==
A section of Gv6, part of the suspected genealogy

In 1957 the Russian epigraphers Nikolai Butinov and Yuri Knorozov (who in 1952 had provided the key insights that would later lead to the decipherment of the Maya writing system) suggested that the repetitive structure of a sequence of some fifteen glyphs on Gv5–6 (lines 5 and 6 of the verso of the Small Santiago Tablet) was compatible with a genealogy. It reads in part,

Now, if the repeated independent glyph 200 is a title, such as "king", and if the repeated attached glyph 76 is a patronymic marker, then this means something like:

King A, B's son, King B, C's son, King C, D's son, King D, E's son,

and the sequence is a lineage.

Although no-one has been able to confirm Butinov and Knorozov's hypothesis, it is widely considered plausible. If it is correct, then, first, we can identify other glyph sequences which constitute personal names. Second, the Santiago Staff would consist mostly of persons' names as it bears 564 occurrences of glyph 76, the putative patronymic marker, one fourth of the total of 2320 glyphs. Third, the sequence 606.76 700, translated by Fischer (below) as "all the birds copulated with the fish", would in reality mean (So-and-so) son of 606 was killed. The Santiago Staff, with 63 occurrences of glyph 700, a rebus for îka "victim", would then be in part a kohau îka (list of war casualties).

== Barthel ==
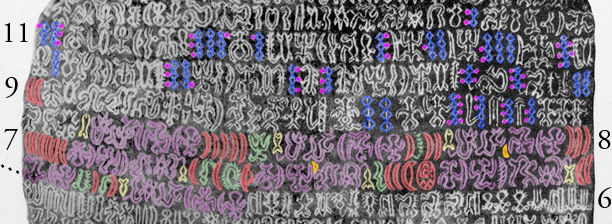
The Mamari calendar starts midway through recto line 6 (bottom center, upside down) and continues to the start of line 9 (top left). Two glyphs are not visible at the start of 7; these complete the heralding sequence at the end of line 6 (ellipsis). Multiple beaded variants of double and triple lozenges (glyph 2 abacus-like "accounting sets") follow the identified calendar.

German ethnologist Thomas Barthel, who first published the rongorongo corpus, identified three lines on the recto (side a) of tablet C, also known as Mamari, as a lunar calendar. Guy proposed that it was more precisely an astronomical rule for whether one or two intercalary nights should be inserted into the 28-night Rapanui month to keep it in sync with the phases of the moon, and if one night, whether this should come before or after the full moon. Berthin and Berthin propose that it is the text which follows the identified calendar that shows where the intercalary nights should appear. The Mamari calendar is the only example of rongorongo whose function is currently accepted as being understood, though it cannot actually be read.

In Guy's interpretation, the core of the calendar is a series of 29 left-side crescents ("☾", colored red on the photo of the table at right) on either side of the full moon, , a pictogram of te nuahine kā ꞌumu ꞌa rangi kotekote 'the old woman lighting an earth oven in the kotekote sky'—the Man in the Moon of Oceanic mythology. These correspond to the 28 basic and two intercalary nights of the old Rapa Nui lunar calendar.

The old calendar
Day & name		Day & name	
*1	ata	*15	motohi
2	ari (hiro)	16	kokore 1
3	kokore 1	17	kokore 2
4	kokore 2	18	kokore 3
5	kokore 3	19	kokore 4
6	kokore 4	20	kokore 5
7	kokore 5	21	tapume
8	kokore 6	22	matua
*9	maharu	*23	rongo
10	hua	24	rongo tane
11	atua	25	mauri nui
*x	hotu	26	mauri kero
12	maure	27	mutu
13	ina-ira	28	tireo
14	rakau	*x	hiro

*ata dark moon, maharu waxing half,
motohi full moon, rongo waning half,
hotu & hiro intercalary days

the heralding sequence

Heralding sequences: Two instances of the "heralding sequence" from line Ca7, one from before and one from after the full moon. The fish at the end of the latter is inverted, and (in the sequence immediately following the full moon only) the long-necked bird is reversed.

These thirty nights, starting with the new moon, are divided into eight groups by a "heralding sequence" of four glyphs (above, and colored purple on the tablet at right) which ends in the pictogram of a fish on a line (yellow). The heralding sequences each contain two right-side lunar crescents ("☽"). In all four heralding sequences preceding the full moon the fish is head up; in all four following it the fish is head down, suggesting the waxing and waning of the moon. The way the crescents are grouped together reflects the patterns of names in the old calendar. The two ☾ crescents at the end of the calendar, introduced with an expanded heralding sequence, represent the two intercalary nights held in reserve. The eleventh crescent, with the bulge, is where one of those nights is found in Thomson's and Métraux's records.

Guy notes that the further the Moon is from the Earth in its eccentric orbit, the slower it moves, and the more likely the need to resort to an intercalary night to keep the calendar in sync with its phases. He hypothesizes that the "heralding sequences" are instructions to observe the apparent diameter of the Moon, and that the half-size superscripted crescents (orange) preceding the sixth night before and sixth night after the full moon represent the small apparent diameter at apogee which triggers intercalation. (Note: The first small crescent corresponds to the position of hotu in Thomson and Métraux.)

Seven of the calendrical crescents (red) are accompanied by other glyphs (green). Guy suggests syllabic readings for some of these, based on possible rebuses and correspondences with the names of the nights in the old calendar. The two sequences of six and five nights without such accompanying glyphs (beginning of line 7, and transition of lines 7–8) correspond to the two groups of six and five numbered kokore nights, which do not have individual names.

== Fischer ==
In 1995 independent linguist Steven R. Fischer, who also claims to have deciphered the enigmatic Phaistos Disc, announced that he had cracked the rongorongo "code", making him the only person in history to have deciphered two such scripts. In the decades since, this has not been accepted by other researchers, who feel that Fischer overstated the single pattern which formed the basis of his decipherment, and note that it has not led to an understanding of other patterns.

=== Decipherment ===
Fischer notes that the long text of the 125-cm Santiago Staff is unlike other texts in that it appears to have punctuation: The 2,320-glyph text is divided by "103 vertical lines at odd intervals" which do not occur on any of the tablets. Fischer remarked that glyph 76, identified as a possible patronymic marker by Butinov and Knorozov, is attached to the first glyph in each section of text, and that "almost all" sections contain a multiple of three glyphs, with the first bearing a 76 "suffix". (Note: See, for example, figure 2 of Fischer's on-line article, at the start of line I5 (Fischer's line 8), where vertical bars delineate some of these X-Y-Z triplets. The pattern can be summarized as: | X.76 Y Z X.76 Y Z A A | X.76 Y Z | X.76 Y Z | X.76 Y Z X.76 Y Z X.76 Y Z | X.76 Y Z X.76(?) Y Z X.76 Y Z | X.76 Y Z | X.76 Y Z X.76 Y Z X.76 Y Z Z | X.76 Y Z | X.76 Y |, However, the text continues with | X.76 76 Z.76 A B X.76 76 Z.76 |, etc. which breaks the pattern both in terms of triplets and in the placement of the 'phalluses'. This is not visible in Fischer's truncated figure 2, but can be seen in the complete text.)

Fischer identified glyph 76 as a phallus and the text of the Santiago Staff as a creation chant consisting of hundreds of repetitions of X–phallus Y Z, which he interpreted as X copulated with Y, there issued forth Z. His primary example was this one:

about half-way through line 12 of the Santiago Staff. Fischer interpreted glyph 606 as "bird"+"hand", with the phallus attached as usual at its lower right; glyph 700 as "fish"; and glyph 8 as "sun". (Note: In the Jaussen list, 600 (606 without the hand) is identified as a frigatebird or as a bird flying (p 4), 700 as a fish (p 4), and 8 variously as the sun, a star, or fire (pp 2–3). 76 is not identified.)

On the basis that the Rapanui word maꞌu "to take" is nearly homophonous with a plural marker mau, he posited that the hand of 606 was that plural marker, via a semantic shift of "hand" → "take", and thus translated 606 as "all the birds". Taking penis to mean "copulate", he read the sequence 606.76 700 8 as "all the birds copulated, fish, sun".

Fischer supported his interpretation by claiming similarities to the recitation Atua Matariri, so called from its first words, which was collected by William Thomson. This recitation is a litany where each verse has the form X, ki ꞌai ki roto ki Y, ka pû te Z, literally "X having been inside Y the Z comes forward". Here is the first verse, according to Salmon and then according to Métraux (neither of whom wrote glottal stops or long vowels):

Atua Matariri; Ki ai Kiroto, Kia Taporo, Kapu te Poporo.
"God Atua Matariri and goddess Taporo produced thistle."

— Salmon

Atua-matariri ki ai ki roto ki a te Poro, ka pu te poporo.
"God-of-the-angry-look by copulating with Roundness (?) produced the poporo (black nightshade, Solanum nigrum)."

— Métraux

Fischer proposed that the glyph sequence 606.76 700 8, literally MANU:MAꞋU.ꞋAI ÎKA RAꞋÂ "bird:hand.penis fish sun", had the analogous phonetic reading of:

te manu mau ki ꞌai ki roto ki te îka, ka pû te raꞌâ
"All the birds copulated with the fish; there issued forth the sun."

He claimed similar phallic triplets for several other texts. However, in the majority of texts glyph 76 is not common, and Fischer proposed that these were a later, more developed stage of the script, where the creation chants had been abbreviated to X Y Z and omit the phallus. He concluded that 85% of the rongorongo corpus consisted of such creation chants, and that it was only a matter of time before rongorongo would be fully deciphered.

=== Objections ===
There are a number of objections to Fischer's approach:

- When Andrew Robinson checked the claimed pattern, he found that "Close inspection of the Santiago Staff reveals that only 63 out of the 113 [sic] sequences on the staff fully obey the triad structure (and 63 is the maximum figure, giving every Fischer attribution the benefit of the doubt)." Glyph 76 occurs sometimes in isolation, sometimes compounded with itself, and sometimes in the 'wrong' part (or even all parts) of the triplets. Other than on the Staff, Pozdniakov could find Fischer's triplets only in the poorly preserved text of Ta and in the single line of Gv which Butinov and Knorozov suggested might be a genealogy.
- Pozdniakov and Pozdniakov calculated that altogether the four glyphs of Fischer's primary example make up 20% of the corpus. "Hence it is easy to find examples in which, on the contrary, 'the sun copulates with the fish', and sometimes also with the birds. Fischer does not mention the resulting chaos in which everything is copulating in all manner of unlikely combinations. Furthermore, it is by no means obvious in what sense this 'breakthrough' is 'phonetic'."
- The plural marker mau does not exist in Rapanui, but is instead an element of Tahitian grammar. However, even if it did occur in Rapanui, Polynesian mau is only a plural marker when it precedes a noun; after a noun it is an adjective which means "true, genuine, proper".
- No Polynesian myth tells of birds copulating with fish to produce the sun. Fischer justifies his interpretation thus: This is very close to [verse] number 25 from Daniel Ure Vaꞌe Iko's procreation chant [Atua Matariri] "Land copulated with the fish Ruhi Paralyzer: There issued forth the sun." However, this claim depends on Salmon's English translation, which does not follow from his Rapanui transcription of

Heima; Ki ai Kiroto Kairui Kairui-Hakamarui Kapu te Raa.

Métraux gives the following interpretation of that verse:

He Hina [He ima?] ki ai ki roto kia Rui-haka-ma-rui, ka pu te raa.
"Moon (?) by copulating with Darkness (?) produced Sun",

which mentions neither birds nor fish.

- Given Fischer's reading, Butinov and Knorozov's putative genealogy on tablet Gv becomes semantically odd, with several animate beings copulating with the same human figure to produce themselves:

[turtle] copulated with [man], there issued forth [turtle]
[shark?] copulated with [man] there issued forth [shark]
etc. (Note: Fischer was familiar with Butinov and Knorozov's article, and describes their contribution as "a milestone in rongorongo studies". Yet he dismisses their hypothesis thus: "Unfortunately, [Butinov's] proof for this claim consisted again, as in 1956, of the "genealogy" which Butinov believed is inscribed on the verso of the "Small Santiago Tablet" [tablet Gv]. In actual fact, this text appears instead to be a procreation chant whose X^{1}YZ structure radically differs from what Butinov has segmented for this text.")

- Cryptologist Tomi Melka deduced that Fischer's hypothesis cannot be true for the entire Staff, let alone other texts.
- Computational linguist Richard Sproat could not replicate the parallels Fischer claimed between the Santiago Staff and the other texts. He automated the search for string matches between the texts and found that the staff stood alone:

As an attempt at a test for Fischer's "phallus omission" assumption, we computed the same string matches for a version of the corpus where glyph 76, the phallus symbol, had been removed. Presumably if many parts of the other tablets are really texts which are like the Santiago Staff, albeit sans explicit phallus, one ought to increase one's chance of finding matches between the Staff and other tablets by removing the offending member. The results were the same as for the unadulterated version of the corpus: the Santiago staff still appears as an isolate.

— Sproat 2003

== Pozdniakov ==
In the 1950s, Butinov and Knorozov had performed a statistical analysis of several rongorongo texts and had concluded that either the language of the texts was not Polynesian, or that it was written in a condensed telegraphic style, because it contained no glyphs comparable in frequency to Polynesian grammatical particles such as the Rapanui articles te and he or the preposition ki. These findings have since been used to argue that rongorongo is not a writing system at all, but mnemonic proto-writing. However, Butinov and Knorozov had used Barthel's preliminary encoding, which Konstantin Pozdniakov, senior researcher at the Museum of Anthropology and Ethnography of the Russian Academy of Sciences in Saint Petersburg (until 1996), noted was inappropriate for statistical analysis. The problem, as Butinov and Knorozov, and Barthel himself, had admitted, was that in many cases distinct numerical codes had been assigned to ligatures and allographs, as if these were independent glyphs. The result was that while Barthel's numerical transcription of a text enabled a basic discussion of its contents for the first time, it failed to capture its linguistic structure and actually interfered with inter-text comparison.

In 2011, Pozdniakov released a pre-press publication analyzing Text E Keiti, including a glyph-by-glyph comparison of the transcription in Barthel (1958), with misidentified glyphs corrected per Horley (2010).

=== Revising the glyph inventory ===
To resolve this deficiency, Pozdniakov (1996) reanalyzed thirteen of the better preserved texts, attempting to identify all ligatures and allographs in order to better approach a one-to-one correspondence between graphemes and their numeric representation. He observed that all these texts but I and G verso consist predominantly of shared phrases (sequences of glyphs), which occur in different orders and contexts on different tablets. (Note: Pozdniakov did not tabulate the short texts J, L, X; the fragments F, W, Y; the mostly obliterated texts M, O, T–V, Z; nor tablet D, though he did identify some sequences shared with Y and discussed possible reading orders of D. However, he notes that T shares short sequences with I and Gv rather than with the other texts.) By 2007 he had identified some one hundred shared phrases, each between ten and one hundred glyphs long. Even setting aside the completely parallel texts Gr–K and the 'Grand Tradition' of H–P–Q, he found that half of the remainder comprises such phrases:

Phrasing: Variants of this twenty-glyph phrase, all missing some of these glyphs or adding others, are found twelve times, in eight of the thirteen texts Pozdniakov tabulated: lines Ab4, Cr2–3, Cv2, Cv12, Ev3, Ev6, Gr2–3, Hv12, Kr3, Ra6, Rb6, and Sa1. Among other things, such phrases have established or confirmed the reading order of some of the tablets.

These shared sequences begin and end with a notably restricted set of glyphs. For example, many begin or end, or both, with glyph 62 (an arm ending in a circle: ) or with a ligature where glyph 62 replaces the arm or wing of a figure (see the ligature image under Kudrjavtsev et al.).

Contrasting these phrases allowed Pozdniakov to determine that some glyphs occur in apparent free variation both in isolation and as components of ligatures. Thus he proposed that the two hand shapes, 6 (three fingers and a thumb) and 64 (a four-fingered forked hand), are graphic variants of a single glyph, which also attaches to or replaces the arms of various other glyphs:

Allographs: The 'hand' allographs (left), plus some of the fifty pairs of allographic 'hand' ligatures to which Barthel had assigned distinct character codes.

The fact the two hands appear to substitute for each other in all these pairs of glyphs when the repeated phrases are compared lends credence to their identity. Similarly, Pozdniakov proposed that the heads with "gaping mouths", as in glyph 380, are variants of the bird heads, so that the entirety of Barthel's 300 and 400 series of glyphs are seen as either ligatures or variants of the 600 series.

Despite finding that some of the forms Barthel had assumed were allographs appeared instead to be independent glyphs, such as the two orientations of his glyph 27, , the overall conflation of allographs and ligatures greatly reduced the size of Barthel's published 600-glyph inventory. By recoding the texts with these findings and then recomparing them, Pozdniakov was able to detect twice as many shared phrases, which enabled him to further consolidate the inventory of glyphs. By 2007, he and his father, a pioneer in Russian computer science, had concluded that 52 glyphs accounted for 99.7% of the corpus. (Note: The other 0.3% were made up of two dozen glyphs with limited distribution, many of them hapax legomena. This analysis excluded the Santiago Staff, which contained another three or four frequent glyphs.) From this he deduced that rongorongo is essentially a syllabary, though mixed with non-syllabic elements, possibly determinatives or logographs for common words (see below). The data analysis, however, has not been published.

Pozdniakov's proposed basic inventory
Glyph 001	Glyph 002	Glyph 003	Glyph 004	Glyph 005	Glyph 006	Glyph 007	Glyph 008	Glyph 009	Glyph 010	Glyph 014	Glyph 015	Glyph 016
01	02	03	04	05	06	07	08	09	10	14	15	16
Glyph 022	Glyph 025	Glyph 027	Glyph 028	Glyph 034	Glyph 038	Glyph 041	Glyph 044	Glyph 046	Glyph 047	Glyph 050	Glyph 052	Glyph 053
22	25	27a	28	34	38	41	44	46	47	50	52	53
Glyph 059	Glyph 060	Glyph 061	Glyph 062	Glyph 063	Glyph 066	Glyph 067	Glyph 069	Glyph 070	Glyph 071	Glyph 074	Glyph 076	Glyph 091
59	60	61	62	63	66	67	69	70	71	74	76	91
Glyph 095	Glyph 099	Glyph 200	Glyph 240	Glyph 280	Glyph 380	Glyph 400	Glyph 530	Glyph 660	Glyph 700	Glyph 720	Glyph 730	Glyph 901
95	99	200	240	280	380	400	530	660	700	720	730	901
Glyph 901 was first proposed by Pozdniakov. The inverted variant 27b in Barthel's glyph 27 appears to be a distinct glyph. Although 99 looks like a ligature of 95 and 14, statistically it behaves like a separate glyph, similar to how Latin Q and R do not behave as combinations of O and P plus a stroke, but as separate letters.

The shared repetitive nature of the phrasing of the texts, apart from Gv and I, suggests to Pozdniakov that they are not integral texts, and cannot contain the varied contents which would be expected for history or mythology. In the following table of characters in the Pozdniakov & Pozdniakov inventory, ordered by descending frequency, the first two rows of 26 characters account for 86% of the entire corpus.

Glyph 006	Glyph 200	Glyph 010	Glyph 400	Glyph 001	Glyph 003	Glyph 002	Glyph 062	Glyph 380	Glyph 061	Glyph 280	Glyph 700	Glyph 004
Glyph 041	Glyph 660	Glyph 022	Glyph 009	Glyph 063	Glyph 240	Glyph 005	Glyph 008	Glyph 066	Glyph 730	Glyph 901	Glyph 095	Glyph 044
Glyph 007	Glyph 034	Glyph 069	Glyph 047	Glyph 070	Glyph 059	Glyph 050	Glyph 099	Glyph 076	Glyph 046	Glyph 060	Glyph 067	Glyph 053
Glyph 052	Glyph 074	Glyph 016	Glyph 027	Glyph 038	Glyph 028	Glyph 071	Glyph 091	Glyph 025	Glyph 015	Glyph 720	Glyph 530	Glyph 014

== Bibliography ==
- Bahn, Paul (1996). "Cracking the Easter Island code". New Scientist. Vol. 150, no. 2034. pp. 36–39.
- Barthel, Thomas S. (1958). Grundlagen zur Entzifferung der Osterinselschrift [Bases for the Decipherment of the Easter Island Script] (in German). De Gruyter Mouton. doi:10.1515/9783111641256. ISBN 978-3-11-164125-6.
- Barthel, Thomas S. (1978). The Eighth Land. University of Hawaii Press. doi:10.1515/9780824887186. ISBN 978-0-8248-8718-6.
- Berthin, Gordon; Berthin, Michael (2006). "Astronomical Utility and Poetic Metaphor in the Rongorongo Lunar Calendar". Applied Semiotics. 8 (18): 85–98. Archived from the original on 2008-02-24.
- Butinov, Nikolai A.; Knorozov, Yuri (1957). "Preliminary Report on the Study of the Written Language of Easter Island". Journal of the Polynesian Society. 66 (1): 5–17.
- Carroll, Alan (1892). "The Easter Island inscriptions, and the translation and interpretation of them". Journal of the Polynesian Society. 1 (2): 103–106, 233–252. ISSN 0032-4000. JSTOR 20701239.
- Carter, Jennifer M. T. (January 2003). "For the Sake of All Women". NLA News. VIII (4). Archived from the original on 2003-03-13.
- Comrie, Bernard; Matthews, Stephen; Polinsky, Maria, eds. (1996). The Atlas of Languages: The Origin and Development of Languages throughout the World. Facts on File. ISBN 0-8160-3388-9. OCLC 32348570.
- Englert, Sebastián (1970). Island at the center of the world: new light on Easter Island. Scribner.
- Englert, Sebastián (1993). La tierra de Hotu Matuꞌa — Historia y Etnología de la Isla de Pascua, Gramática y Diccionario del antiguo idioma de la isla [The Land of Hotu Matuꞌa: History and Ethnology of Easter Island, Grammar and Dictionary of the Old Language of the Island] (in Spanish) (6th ed.). Editorial Universitaria.
- Fedorova, Irina (1995). Дощечки кохау ронгоронго из Кунсткамеры [The Kohau Rongorongo Tablets of the Kunstkamera] (in Russian). Peter the Great Museum of Anthropology and Ethnography.
- Fischer, Steven Roger (1997a). Rongorongo: The Easter Island Script: History, Traditions, Texts. Oxford Studies in Anthropological Linguistics. Clarendon Press. ISBN 0-19-823710-3. OCLC 37260890.
- Fischer, Steven Roger (1997b). Glyph-breaker: A Decipherer's Story. Copernicus. ISBN 0-387-98241-8. OCLC 36672031.
- Guy, Jacques B. M. (1990). "On the Lunar Calendar of Tablet Mamari". Journal de la Société des Océanistes. 91 (2): 135–149. doi:10.3406/jso.1990.2882. Archived from the original on 2008-03-13.
- Guy, Jacques B. M. (1992). "À propos des mois de l'ancien calendrier pascuan" [On the months of the old Easter Island calendar]. Journal de la Société des Océanistes (in French). 94 (1): 119–125. doi:10.3406/jso.1992.2611. ISSN 0300-953X.
- Guy, Jacques B. M. (1998). "Un prétendu déchiffrement des tablettes de l'île de Pâques" [A purported decipherment of the Easter Island tablets]. Journal de la Société des Océanistes (in French). 106 (1): 57–63. doi:10.3406/jso.1998.2041. ISSN 0300-953X.
- Guy, Jacques B. M. (1999a). "Peut-on se fonder sur le témoignage de Métoro pour déchiffrer les rongo-rongo ?" [Can one rely on the testimony of Metoro to decipher rongorongo?]. Journal de la Société des Océanistes (in French). 108 (1): 125–132. doi:10.3406/jso.1999.2083. ISSN 0300-953X.
- Guy, Jacques B. M. (1999b). "Letter to the CEIPP". Bulletin du Centre d'études sur l'île de Pâques et la Polynésie. 28.
- Guy, Jacques B. M. (2001). "Le calendrier de la tablette Mamari" [The Calendar of the Mamari Tablet]. Bulletin du Centre d'études sur l'île de Pâques et la Polynésie (in French). 47: 1–4.
- Harrison, James Park (1874). "The Hieroglyphics of Easter Island". Journal of the Royal Anthropological Institute of Great Britain and Ireland. 3: 370–383. doi:10.2307/2840910. JSTOR 2840910.
- de Hevesy, Guillaume (1932). "Lettre de M. de Hevesy sur une écriture mystérieuse du bassin de l'Indus" [Letter to Mr Pelliot on a mysterious script of the Indus Valley]. Comptes rendus des séances de l'Académie des Inscriptions et Belles-Lettres (in French). 76 (3): 310. doi:10.3406/crai.1932.76240.
- Horley, Paul (2005). "Allographic Variations and Statistical Analysis of the Rongorongo Script". Rapa Nui Journal. 19 (2): 107–116. S2CID 53658054.
- Horley, Paul (2009). "Review: Words out of wood: Proposals for the decipherment of the Easter Island script, by Mary de Laat" (PDF). Rapa Nui Journal. 23 (2): 165–168.
- Horley, Paul (2010). "Rongorongo tablet Keiti" (PDF). Rapa Nui Journal. 24 (1): 45–56.
- Kieviet, Paulus (2017). A grammar of Rapa Nui. Berlin: Language Science Press. ISBN 978-3-946234-75-3.
- Kudrjavtsev, Boris G. (1949). "Сборник Музея Антропологии и Этнографии" [Compilation of the Museum of Anthropology and Ethnography]. Письменность острова Пасхи [The Writing of Easter Island] (in Russian). Vol. 11. Saint Petersburg. pp. 175–221.
- Melka, Tomi S. (2009). "Some Considerations about the Kohau Rongorongo Script in the Light of a Statistical Analysis of the 'Santiago Staff'". Cryptologia. 33 (1): 24–73. doi:10.1080/01611190802548998. ISSN 0161-1194. S2CID 34817582.
- Métraux, Alfred (1939). "Mysteries of Easter Island" (PDF). Yale Review. 28 (4). New Haven: Yale University: 758–779. Archived from the original (PDF) on 2008-04-06.
- Métraux, Alfred (1940). "Ethnology of Easter Island". Bernice P. Bishop Museum Bulletin. 160. Bernice P. Bishop Museum Press.
- Pozdniakov, Konstantin Igorevič (1996). "Les bases du déchiffrement de l'écriture de l'île de Pâques" [The Bases of Deciphering the Writing of Easter Island]. Journal de la Société des Océanistes. 103 (2): 289–303. doi:10.3406/jso.1996.1995.
- Pozdniakov, Konstantin (2011). "Tablet Keiti and calendar-like structures in Rapanui script". Journal de la Société des Océanistes (132): 39–74. doi:10.4000/jso.6371. ISSN 0300-953X.
- Pozdniakov, Igor; Pozdniakov, Konstantin (2007). "Rapanui Writing and the Rapanui Language: Preliminary Results of a Statistical Analysis". Forum for Anthropology and Culture (3): 3–36.
- Robinson, Andrew (2002). Lost Languages: The Enigma of the World's Undeciphered Scripts. McGraw-Hill. ISBN 978-0-07-135743-2.
- Sproat, Richard (2003). "Approximate String Matches in the Rongorongo Corpus". Richard Sproat's personal website.
- Sproat, Richard (2007). Rongorongo. LSA 369: Writing Systems. the Linguistic Society of America Institute: Stanford University. Archived from the original on 2007-05-04.
- Robinson, Andrew (2007). Rongorongo. LSA 369: Writing Systems. the Linguistic Society of America Institute: Stanford University. Archived from the original on 2007-05-04.
- Thomson, William J. (1889). "Te Pito te Henua, or Easter Island". Report of the United States National Museum for the year ending June 30, 1889. Annual Reports of the Smithsonian Institution for 1889. Washington: Smithsonian Institution. pp. 447–552. hdl:10088/29921.
- Weber, Robert (2003). Morfología verbal del rapa nui, lengua polinésica de Isla de Pascua, y su función en la narración. Valparaíso: Ediciones Universitarias de Valparaíso.
