= Rongorongo text P =

One of the undeciphered texts of Easter Island

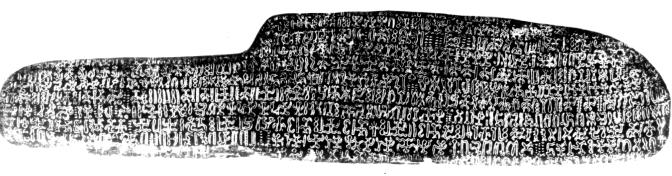

Text P of the rongorongo corpus, the larger of two tablets in St. Petersburg and therefore also known as the Great or Large St Petersburg tablet, is one of two dozen surviving rongorongo texts, and one of three recording the so-called "Grand Tradition".

== Other names ==
P is the standard designation, from Barthel (1958). Fischer (1997) refers to it as RR18.

== Location ==
Peter the Great Museum of Anthropology and Ethnography, St Petersburg. Catalog # 403/13-2.

There are reproductions in the Musée de l'Homme, Paris; the Museum für Völkerkunde, Berlin; and the American Museum of Natural History, New York.

== Description ==
A well-preserved unfluted tablet with a "panhandle", 63 × 15 or 10 × 2 cm, made of Podocarpus latifolius wood (Orliac 2007). There are traces of clay on the tablet, but it does not obscure the glyphs as in tablet Q. Eight lashing holes have been bored along the long edge and another at the end.

== Provenance ==
Fischer (1997) believes that the Large Santiago tablet was likely found by Father Roussel in early 1870, perhaps in Taura Renga house at ꞌOrongo. It was given to the O'Higgins in that year to forward it via Valparaíso to Bishop Jaussen in Tahiti. Jaussen presented this piece to the young Russian anthropologist Nicholai Miklukho-Maklai when the latter visited the Haʻapape Mission from the Vityaz on 24 July 1871. On 30 December 1888, the day before his death, Miklukho-Maklai gave his collection, with both St Petersburg tablets, to the Russian Geographical Society in St Petersburg, which permanently lent them to the museum in 1891.

The nine lashing holes suggest that P had been made into a plank for a canoe, perhaps the same canoe as tablet S. Fischer believes it had probably been initially made from "a damaged and reshapen European or American oar", like tablets A and V.

== Contents ==
Barthel (1958) called tablets H, P, and Q the "Grand Tradition" because of their extensive paraphrased sequences. Since many of these appear on the same lines, Fischer believes one served in part, directly or indirectly, as the model for the others, and that they may have had a common geographic origin.

== Text ==
There are eleven lines on each side for a total of ~ 1,540 glyphs. Line v2 was carved into an existing indentation. A hair-line has been cut along the narrow end with what Fischer believes to have been obsidian. The reading order of the parallel texts H, P, and Q is well established.

Because of the odd number of lines on the recto, the verso starts at the indentation on the top. Fischer reports that several glyphs were traced out with an obsidian flake, without being finished with a shark tooth.

Barthel

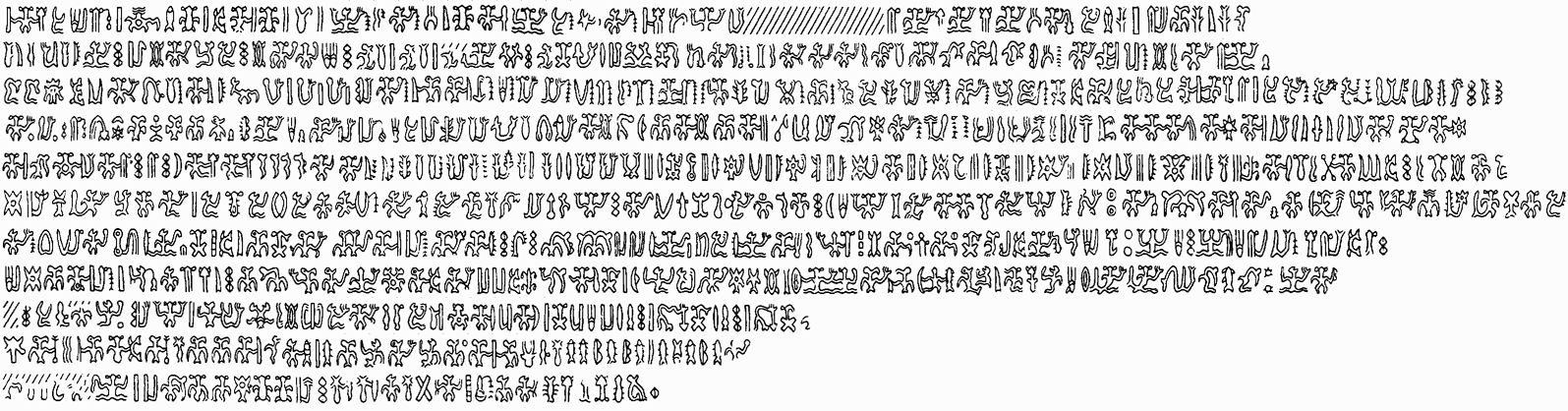
Recto, as traced by Barthel. The lines have been rearranged to reflect English reading order: Pr1 at top, Pr11 at bottom.
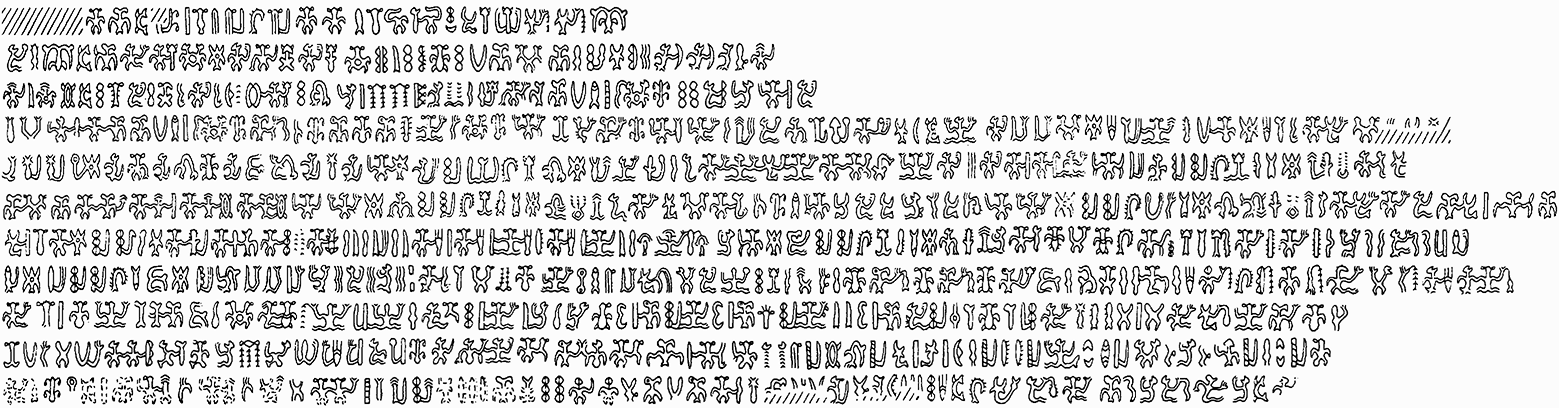
Verso, as traced by Barthel: Pv1 at top, Pv11 at bottom.

Fischer

== Image gallery ==
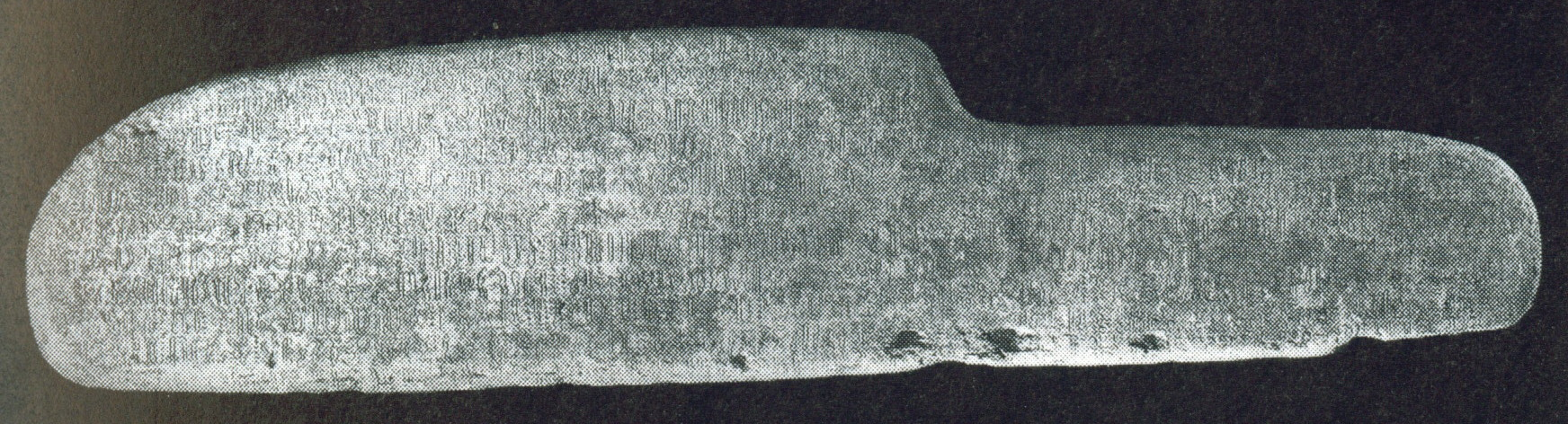
Recto

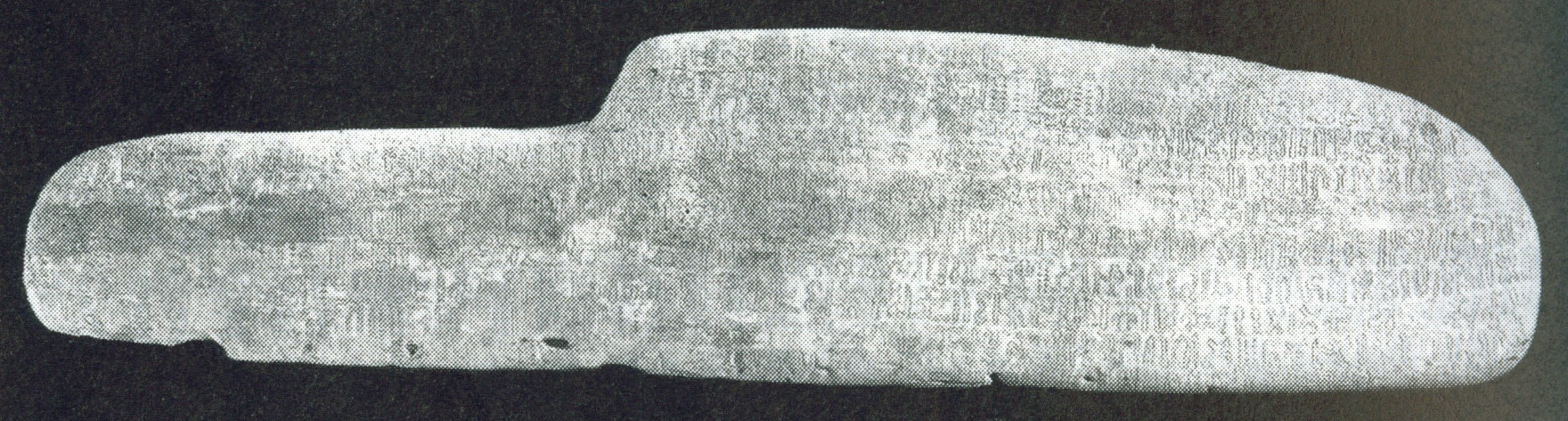
Verso

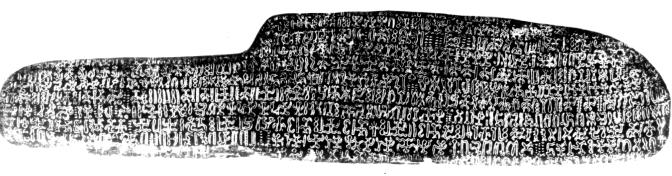
Negative of verso
