= Rongorongo text R =

One of the undeciphered texts of Easter Island

Text R of the rongorongo corpus, the smaller of two tablets in Washington, D.C. and therefore also known as the Small Washington tablet, is one of two dozen surviving rongorongo texts.

== Other names ==
R is the standard designation, from Barthel (1958). Fischer (1997) refers to it as RR15.

This piece is commonly known as Atua Mata Riri, after the first name in a chant that Ure Vaꞌe Iko sang to a photograph of one of Jaussen's tablets, possibly B or H. The error, if it is one, may be due to a misattribution in the Smithsonian publication of Thomson's book (Fischer).

== Location ==
Department of Anthropology, National Museum of Natural History, Smithsonian Institution, Washington. Catalog # A129773.

There is a reproduction in the Musée de l'Homme, Paris.

== Description ==
A short, curved, unfluted tablet, 24 × 9 × 1.8 cm, pitted and with one end broken off, made of unknown wood. There is a hole in the middle of the straight edge, probably for hanging. Short segments of the four middle lines have been obliterated on the right side of side b.

== Provenance ==
In December 1886, Thomson bought both Washington tablets on Easter Island with the mediation of his Tahitian aide Alexander Salmon "after a great deal of trouble and at considerable expense". He gave both to the Smithsonian in April 1890.

The Smithsonian catalog says,

Catalog Number A129773-0
Collector(s) Maj. William Judah Thomson
Collection Date 18 Dec - 31 Dec 1886
Accession Number 023098
Donor Name Thomson, William Judah
Accession Date 1890-Apr-19
INSCRIBED WOODEN TABLET OBTAINED BY W. J. THOMSON, PAYMASTER OF THE U.S. NAVY SHIP 'MOHICAN' IN EASTER ISLAND, DECEMBER 1886. TABLET WAS PURCHASED FROM MR. A. A. SALMON [a.k.a. Tati Salmon], A EUROPEAN SETTLER AND LONG-TIME RESIDENT OF EASTER ISLAND. THOMSON STATES TABLET IS MADE OF NATIVE TOROMIRO WOOD. TABLET IS DISCUSSED AND ILLUSTRATED IN THE USNM ANNUAL REPORT FOR 1889 (PP. 514, 520, 537). TRANSFERRED FROM ETHNOLOGY TO ARCHEOLOGY ON MAY 2, 1933. FORMERLY ON EXHIBIT NMNH HALL 8, UNIT 4.

3 PLASTER CASTS [A129773-1] MADE OF BOTH REVERSE AND OBVERSE SIDES.
This rongorongo tablet or board is sometimes referred to as the Atua Mata Riri tablet. It is also known as the Small Washington tablet. It is illus. Fig. 48, p. 76, in "Splendid Isolation: Art of Easter Island" by Eric Kjellgren, Metropolitan Museum of Art/Yale University Press, 2001, and identified there as an inscribed tablet (kohau rongorongo).
From card for 129773-4: "Engraved with shark's tooth. Transferred to Div. Archeology May 2, 1933."

From second card formerly in Ethnology card file: "No. 129,773: Illus. in USNM AR, 1889; Pl. 38 and 39 [after p. 520]. Translation on p. 520; note on p. 537. Description of acquisition on Easter Island p. 514. Cast made and sent to Musee d' Ethnographic, May, 1933. Loaned to Museum of Modern Art 8-1-84. Returned from Museum of Modern Art 10-4-1985."

== Contents ==
Nearly all of R consists of sequences found in other texts (Pozdniakov and Pozdniakov 2007).

== Text ==
Side a has eight lines (Fischer suspects there may once have been nine), and side b nine lines, for ~ 460 glyphs in all. The edges of the tablet are inscribed.

Barthel

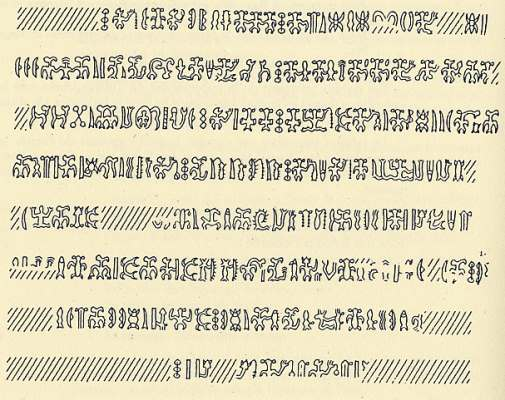
Side a, as traced by Barthel. The lines have been rearranged to reflect English reading order: Ra1 at top, Ra8 at bottom.

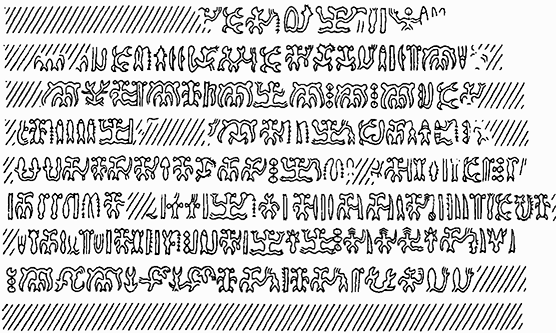
Side b: Rb1 at top, Rb9 (destroyed) at bottom.

Fischer

== Image gallery ==
Ra, color

Rb, color

Inscribed edge, color

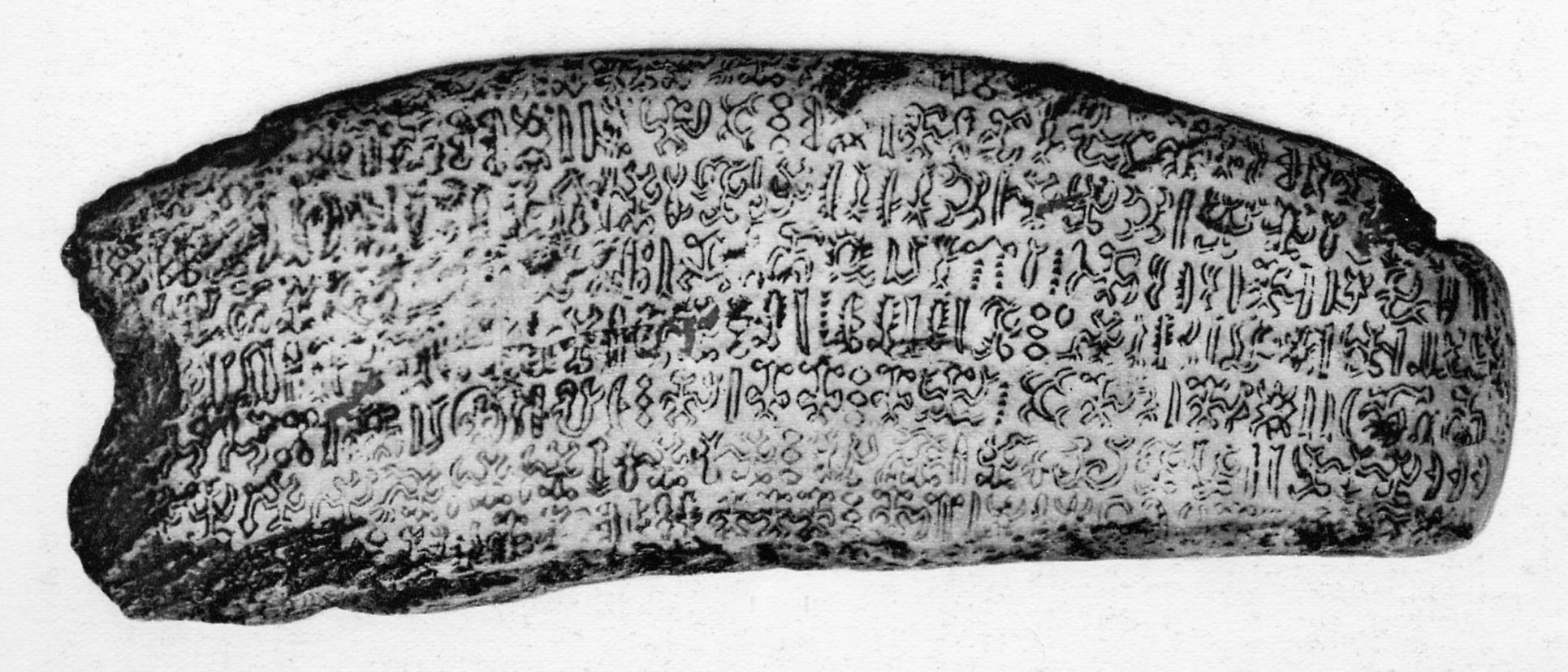
Ra, Chauvet 1935

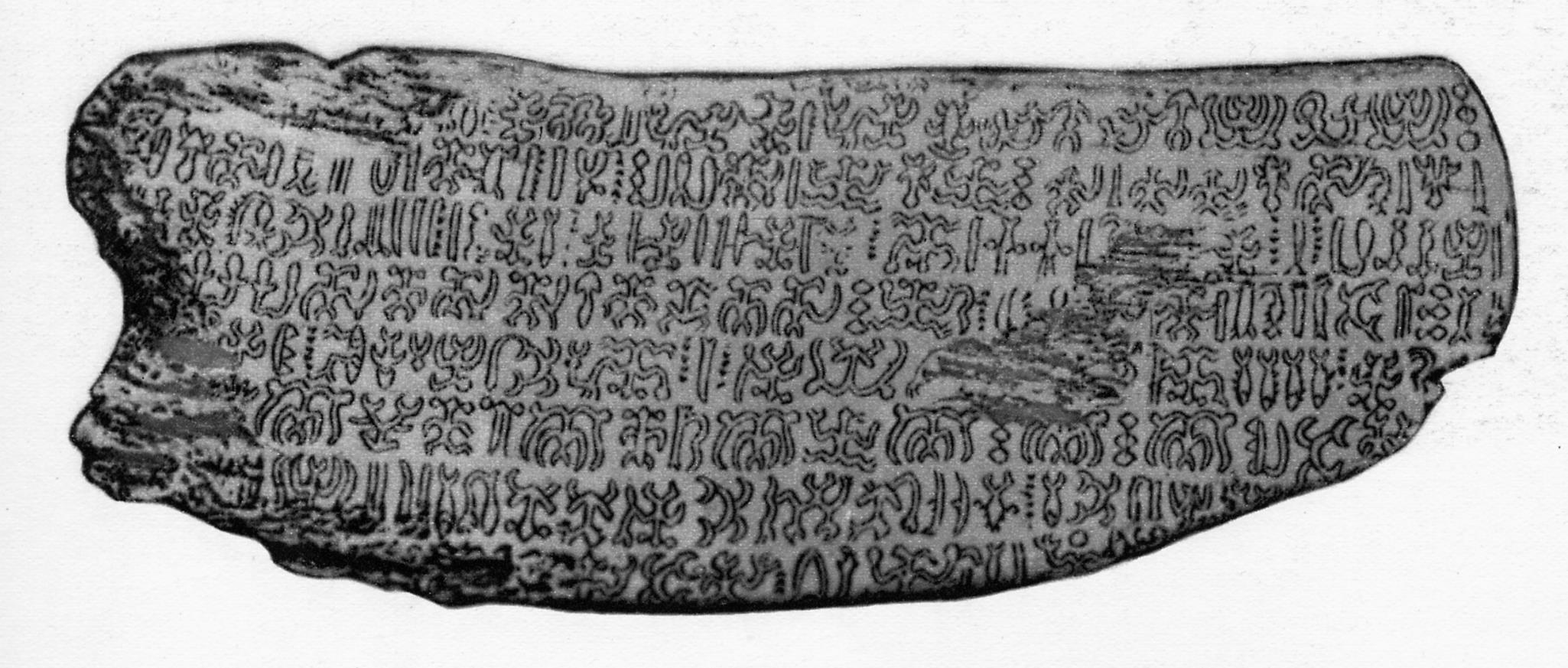
Rb, Chauvet 1935

Inscribed edge

Ra, Smithsonian

Rb, Smithsonian
