= Rongorongo text D =

One of the undeciphered texts of Easter Island

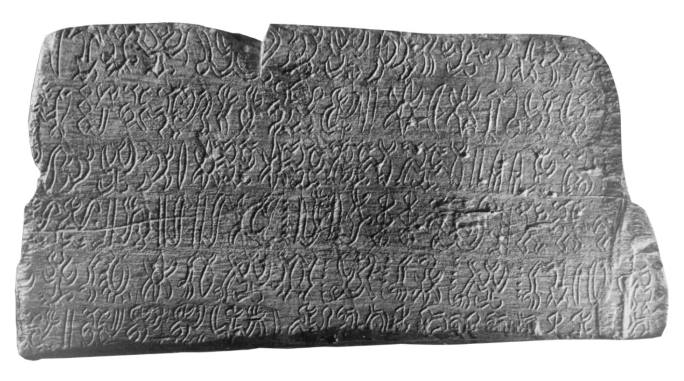

Rongorongo (/ˈrɒŋɡoʊˈrɒŋɡoʊ/; Rapa Nui: [ˈɾoŋoˈɾoŋo]) is a system of glyphs discovered in the 19th century on Easter Island that appears to be writing or proto-writing. Text D of the rongorongo corpus, also known as Échancrée ("notched"), is one of two dozen surviving texts. This is the tablet that started Jaussen's collection.

== Other names ==
D is the standard designation, from Barthel (1958). Fischer (1997) refers to it as RR3.

== Location ==
On long-term loan to the Musée de Tahiti et des Îles, Punaauia, Tahiti.

There are reproductions at the Padri dei Sacri Cuori in Rome (2 copies); the Musée de l'Homme, Paris; the Cinquantenaire, Brussels; and in Steven Fischer's collection in Auckland. In 1990, hundreds of less precise replicas were sold at an exhibition in Brussels.

== Description ==
A broken-off wedge-shaped piece of wood, approx. 30 × 15 cm, it is in good condition though notched on the top and bottom and with a long, deep, horizontal gouge on side a, line 6. It is said to be made of Podocarpus latifolius, a species which does not occur on Easter Island, but other tablets so identified turned out to be Pacific rosewood.

== Provenance ==
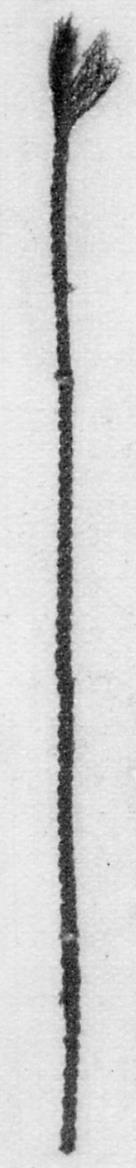
Part of the cord

This tablet bore a gift of a sixteen-meter cord of human hair, perhaps a fishing line, from the recent converts of Easter Island that Father Gaspard Zumbohm and Urupano (Urban) Hina Potegiven delivered to the Bishop Jaussen of Tahiti in 1869. The tablet was merely the spool for this gift, and its notched form suggests that it had been used as a fishing reel before that, showing how far rongorongo had fallen from its once taboo status. It was sent to the headquarters of the Congrégation des Sacrés-Coeurs et de l'Adoration (SSCC) in Paris, where it was deposited in the Missionary Museum, either by Jaussen in 1888 or by the French navy in 1892 after his death. In 1905 it was moved to the SSCC museum in Braine-le-Comte, Belgium. In 1953 it followed the SSCC to Grottaferrata, near Rome, and in 1964 to Rome itself. In 1974 the SSCC moved to its permanent headquarters in Rome, and in 1975 Échancrée was lent to Tahiti on a long-term loan; it was still there as of 1997.

The shape and wood suggest to Fischer (1997) that Échancrée may have been made from a piece of planking of a boat from a European or American ship.

== Contents ==
Line a3 contains a series of figures (glyph 200), holding various objects and irregularly separated by frigatebirds (glyph 600). Fischer (1997) speculates that these may represent a numerical series.

Fischer (1997:422) remarks that the quality of inscription differs markedly between the two sides. Side a is expertly carved, with small, fine glyphs; side b less so, with larger and cruder glyphs, indicating that were written by different authors.

== Text ==
Seven lines of glyphs on side a, with traces of an eighth on its beveled edge; six lines on side b, for ~ 270 glyphs in all, both legible and damaged.

Although Barthel (1958) starts his transcription at the wide end of side a, the start of the text could just as well be at the narrow end (Barthel's line Da8); the same is true of side b. However, as the two sides are written with different hands, it is likely that these are distinct texts, and therefore that the question of recto vs. verso is irrelevant.

Barthel

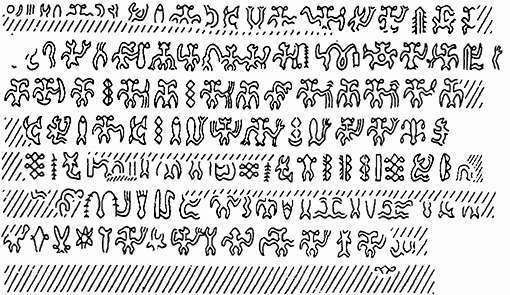
Side a, as traced by Barthel. The lines have been rearranged to reflect English reading order: Da1 at top, Da8 at bottom.

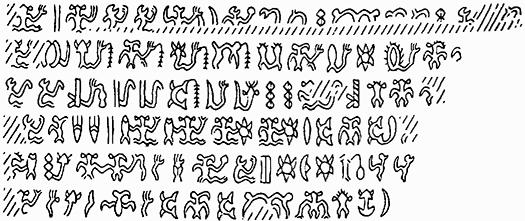
Side b, as traced by Barthel: Db1 at top, Db6 at bottom.

Fischer

== Image gallery ==
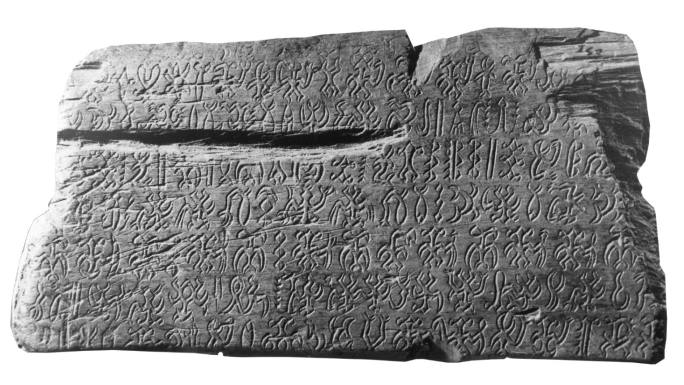
Side a

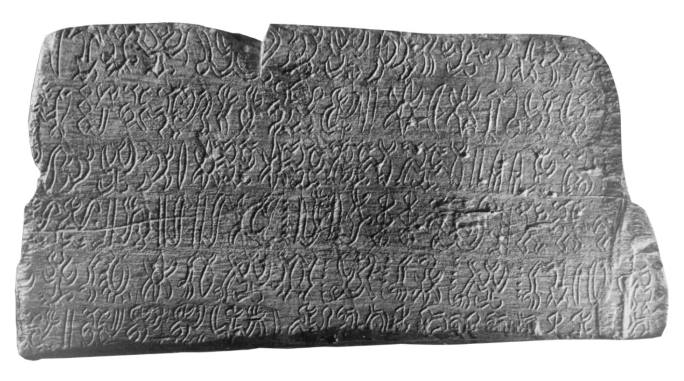
Side b

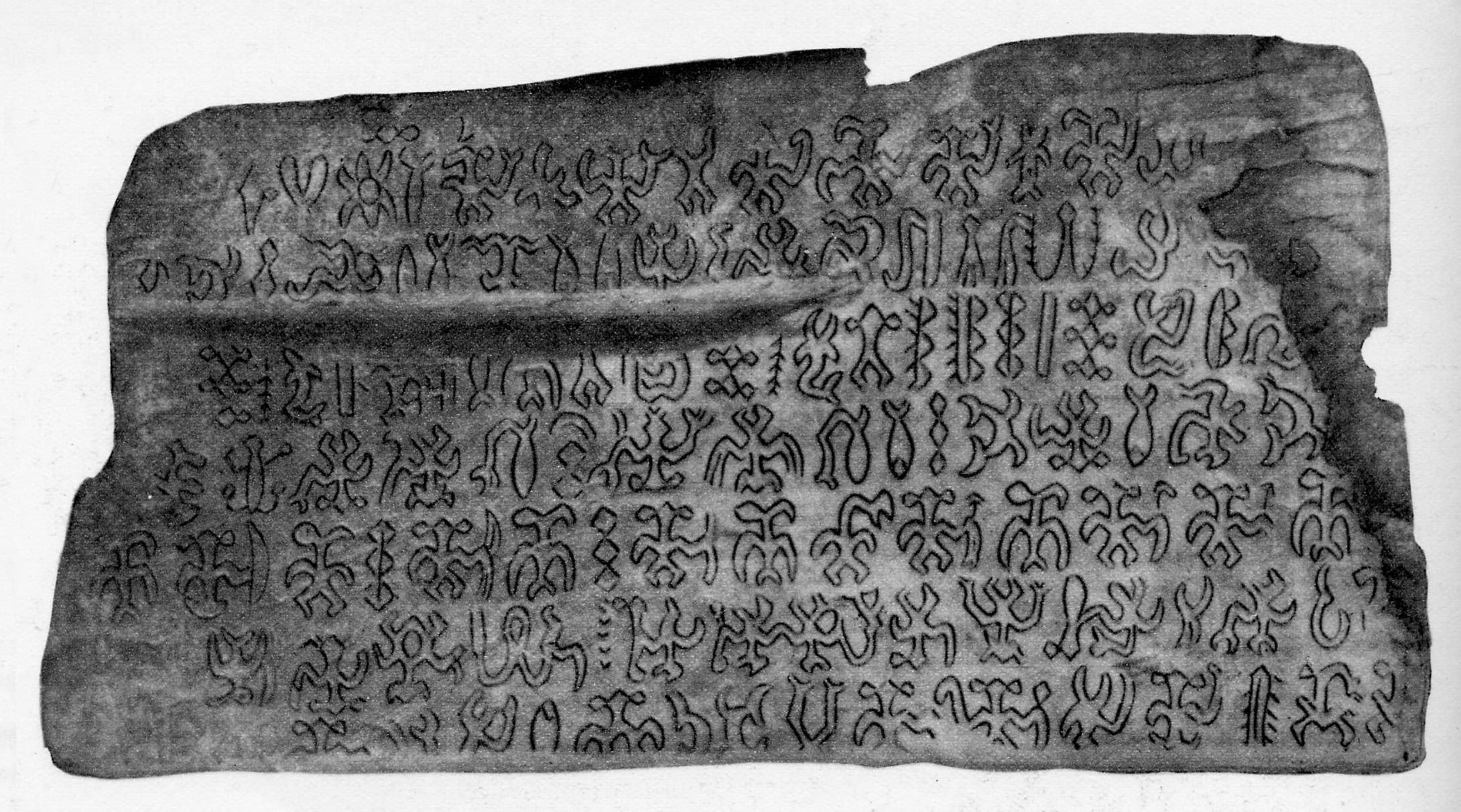
Side a, with glyph tracings

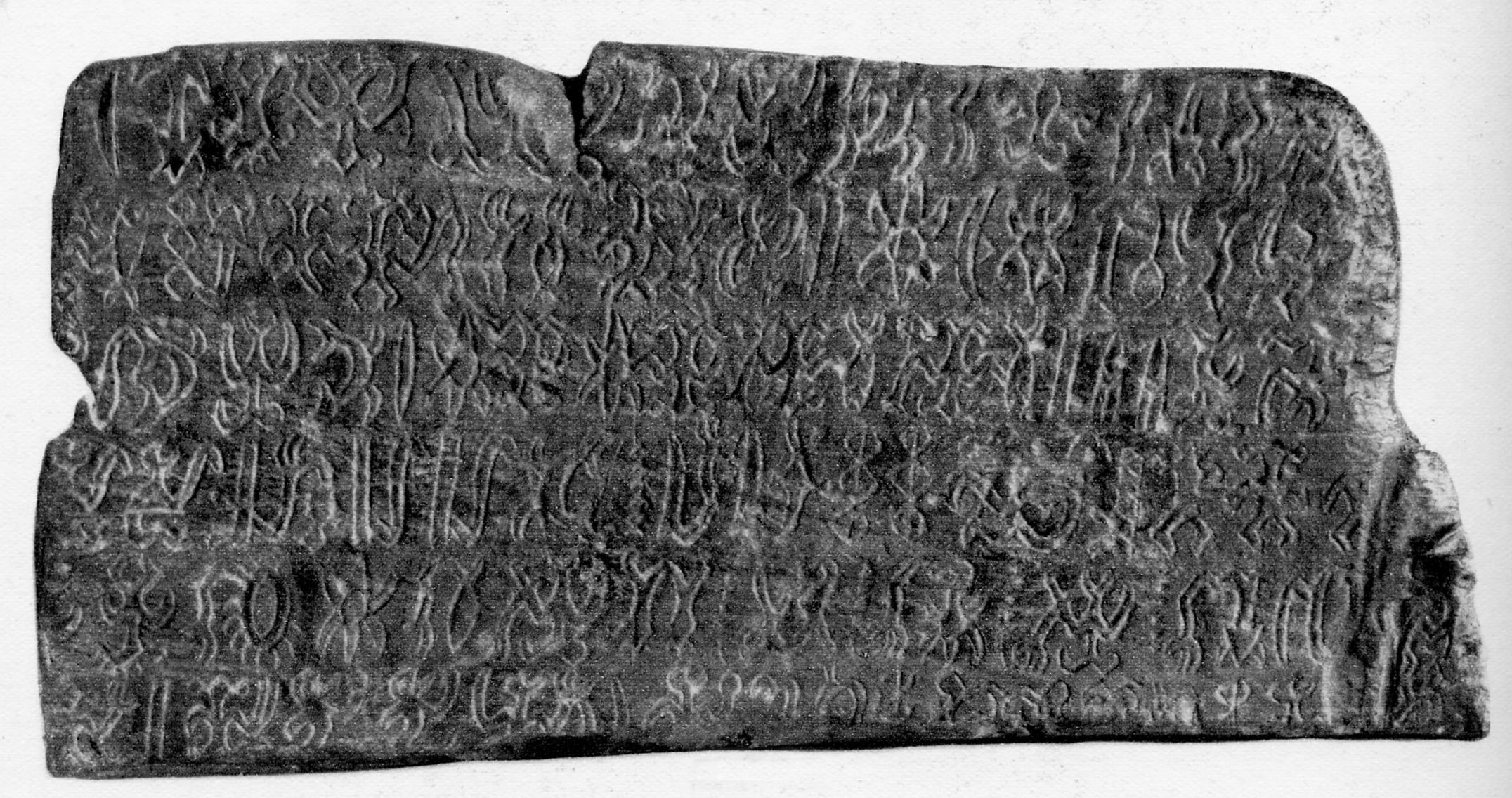
Side b, with glyph tracings
