= Rongorongo text V =

One of the undeciphered texts of Easter Island

Text V of the rongorongo corpus, the Honolulu oar, also known as Honolulu tablet 3 or Honolulu 3622, may be one of two dozen surviving rongorongo texts. Its authenticity has been questioned.

== Other names ==
V is the standard designation, from Barthel (1958). Fischer (1997) refers to it as RR13.

== Location ==
Bernice P. Bishop Museum, Honolulu. Catalog # B.03622.

== Description ==
Apparently the end of a European or American oar, like tablet A, though of unknown wood, and cut with a steel blade. It measures 71.8 × 9 × 2.8 cm and is not fluted. Side a is worm-eaten and split at its thick end; side b has fire damage.

== Provenance ==
Collector J. L. Young of Auckland purchased three of the Honolulu tablets circa 1888 "from Rapanui through a reliable agent", who Fischer thinks was probably Alexander Salmon, Jr. It was transferred to the Bishop Museum in August 1920.

Métraux (1938) did not include V as he did not think it was authentic:

The signs appear to have been incised with a steel implement, and do not show the regularity and beauty of outline which characterise the original tablets.

However, Barthel (1958:32) believed it to be authentic. Fischer is of the opinion that the burnt wood,

indicates that the inscription probably existed at the time that original rongorongo pieces were being annihilated by fire. More convincing evidence, however, that this is an authentic rongorongo inscription is the fact that the sequence 200.200.11-2 is shared with [A]a5 and [G]r8, while the sequence 200-700 is shared with [H]r10 and [H]r11. No post-missionary imitator could have effected this.

However, this reasoning is not sound: juxtaposing the two common glyphs 200 man and 700 fish is hardly remarkable. The only ligature is the 200.200.11-2, whereas known authentic texts, even short ones, have numerous ligatures.

== Text ==
Side a has two areas of text: a single 22-glyph line, with a separate pair of glyphs slightly above and 4 cm to the right of this (on the other side of the label). Fischer reports that on side b pencil rubbings reveal possible traces of an inscription at the edge of the burnt area.

Fischer

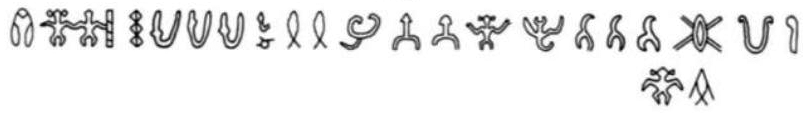
Side a, as traced by Fischer. On the tablet, the pair of glyphs is completely separate from the main line.
