= Rongorongo text A =

One of the undeciphered texts of Easter Island

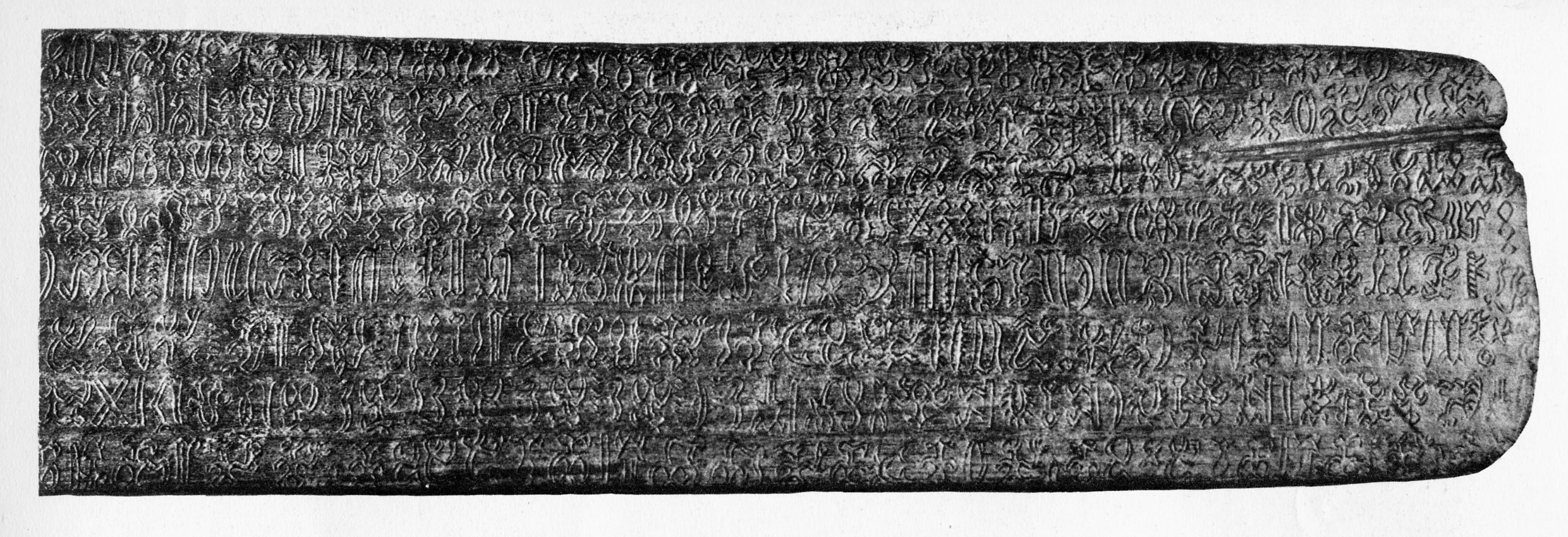

Rongorongo (/ˈrɒŋɡoʊˈrɒŋɡoʊ/; Rapa Nui: [ˈɾoŋoˈɾoŋo]) is a system of glyphs discovered in the 19th century on Easter Island that appears to be writing or proto-writing. Text A of the rongorongo corpus, also known as Tahua, is one of two dozen surviving texts.

== Other names ==
A is the standard designation, from Barthel (1958). Fischer (1997) refers to it as RR1.

It is also known as the Oar (la rame), the object from which it was made.

== Location ==
General archives of the Padri dei Sacri Cuori (SSCC), Casa Generalizia, Via Rivarone 85, I-00166 Rome, Italy.

Reproductions are located at the SSCC; the Bishop Museum, Honolulu; and the Cinquantenaire, Brussels.

== Description ==
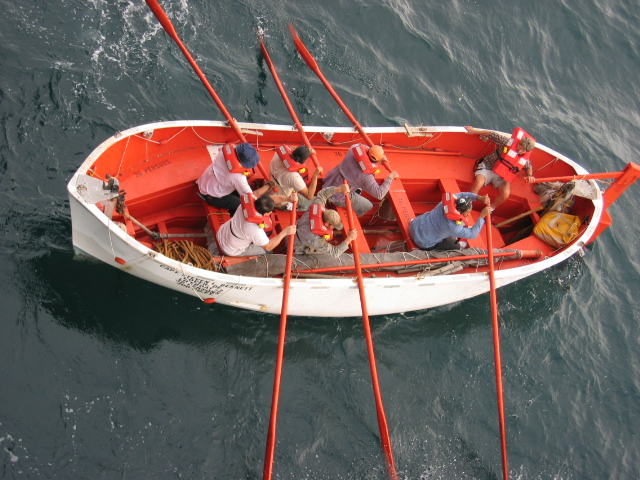
The oars of this boat have blades similar to the one used for tablet A.

Tahua is the cut-off blade of a narrow, rectangular European or American oar, 91 x 11.5 x 2 cm, said to be made of European ash, though the wood has never been tested. It is in excellent condition, with a few ink stains and a few small holes and notches.

== Provenance ==
One of Jaussen's tablets, Tahua was apparently collected on Easter Island by Fathers Roussel and Zumbohm in 1870 and sent to him in Tahiti. It was sent to the headquarters of the Congrégation des Sacrés-Coeurs et de l'Adoration (SSCC) in Paris, where it was deposited in the Missionary Museum, either by Jaussen in 1888 or by the French navy in 1892 after his death. In 1905 it was moved to the SSCC museum in Braine-le-Comte, Belgium. In 1953 it followed the SSCC to Grottaferrata, near Rome, and in 1964 to Rome itself. In 1974 the SSCC moved to its permanent headquarters in Rome.

== Contents ==
The proper starting point of the inscription is unclear. (Jaussen's informant Metoro Tauꞌa Ure 'read' it starting with side b.) Kudryavtsev discovered that several lines of Tahua were paraphrased on the Large St. Petersburg tablet (tablet P).

Barthel (1958) noted sections of the Taure text repeated, in seemingly random distribution, on tablets B Aruku, C Mamari, E Keiti, H Large Santiago, P Large St Petersburg, and Q Small St Petersburg. Butinov (1959:74) suggested that Tahua might contain a genealogy.

== Text ==
There are eight lines of glyphs on each side, with a total of ~ 1,825 glyphs. Through comparison of phrases shared with other texts, Pozdniakov has established that the reading order of the lines follows Barthel, though the order of the two sides may still be either a–b or b–a.

Barthel

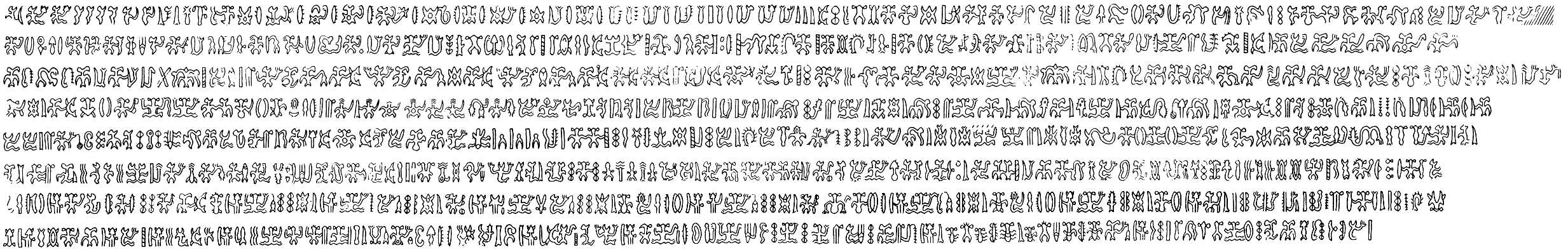
Side a, as traced by Barthel. The lines have been rearranged to reflect English reading order: Aa1 at top, Aa8 at bottom.
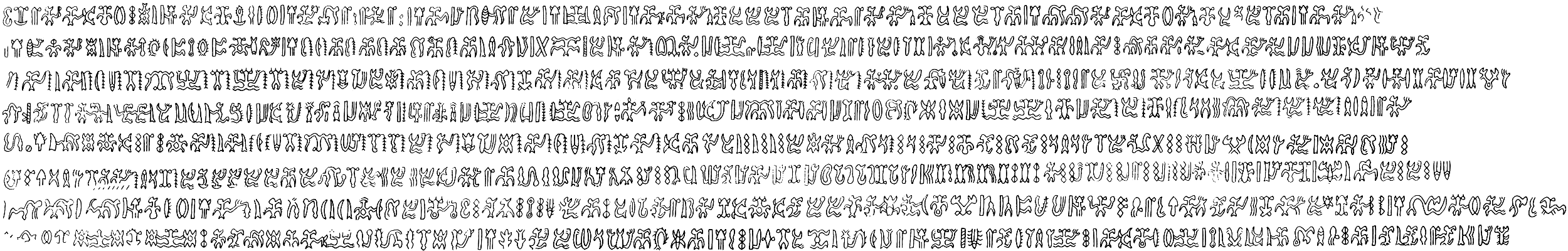
Side b, as traced by Barthel: Ab1 at top, Ab8 at bottom.

Fischer

== Image gallery ==
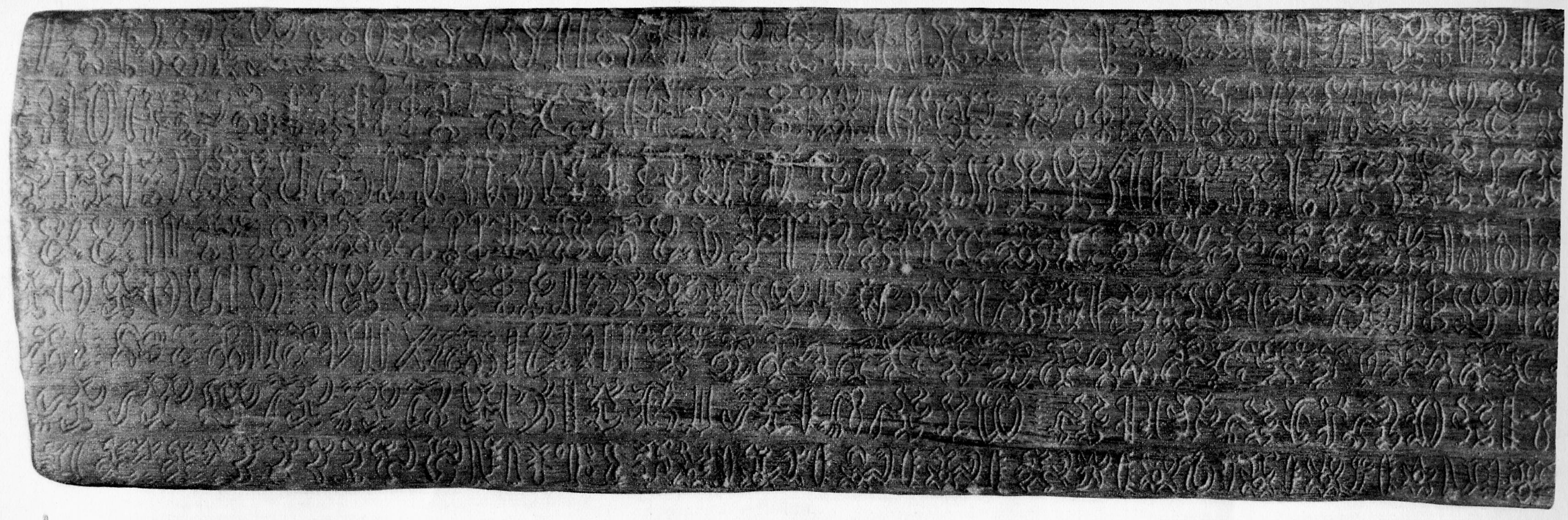
Side a left end

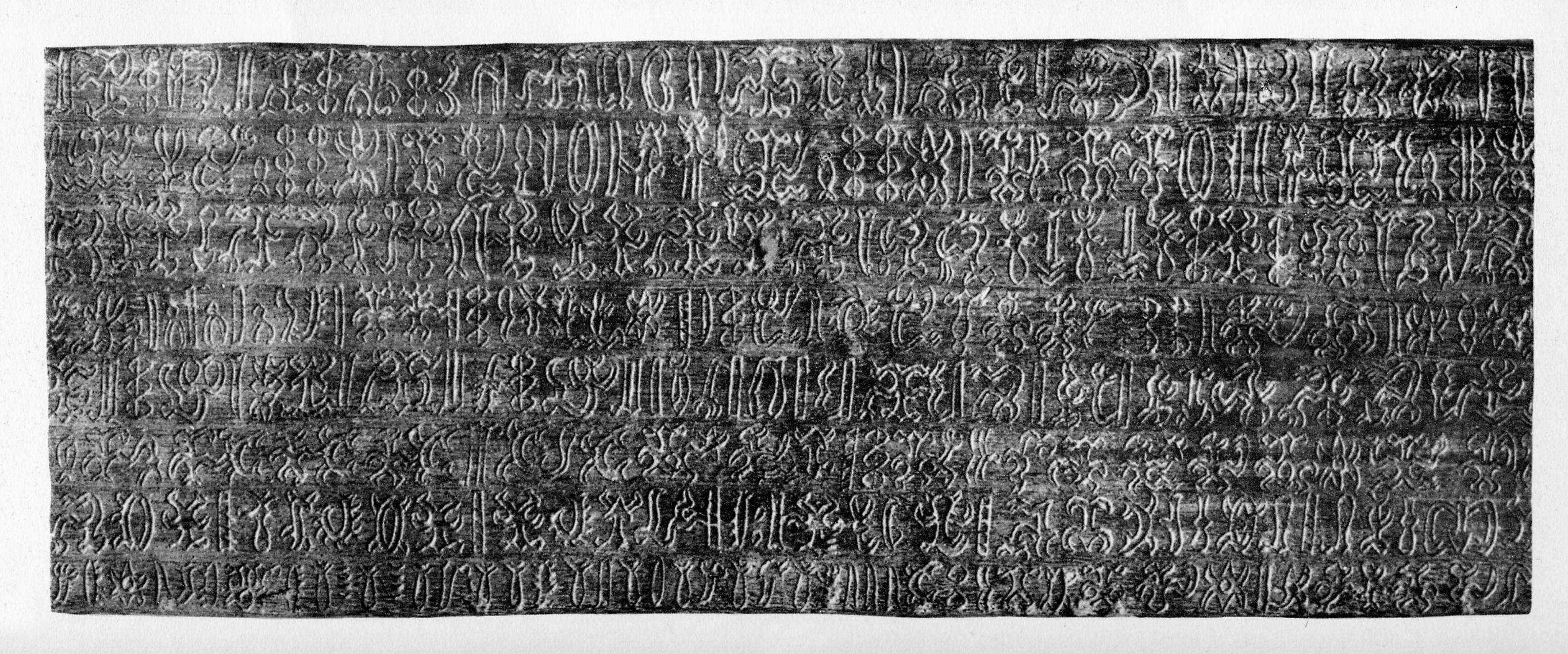
Side a center

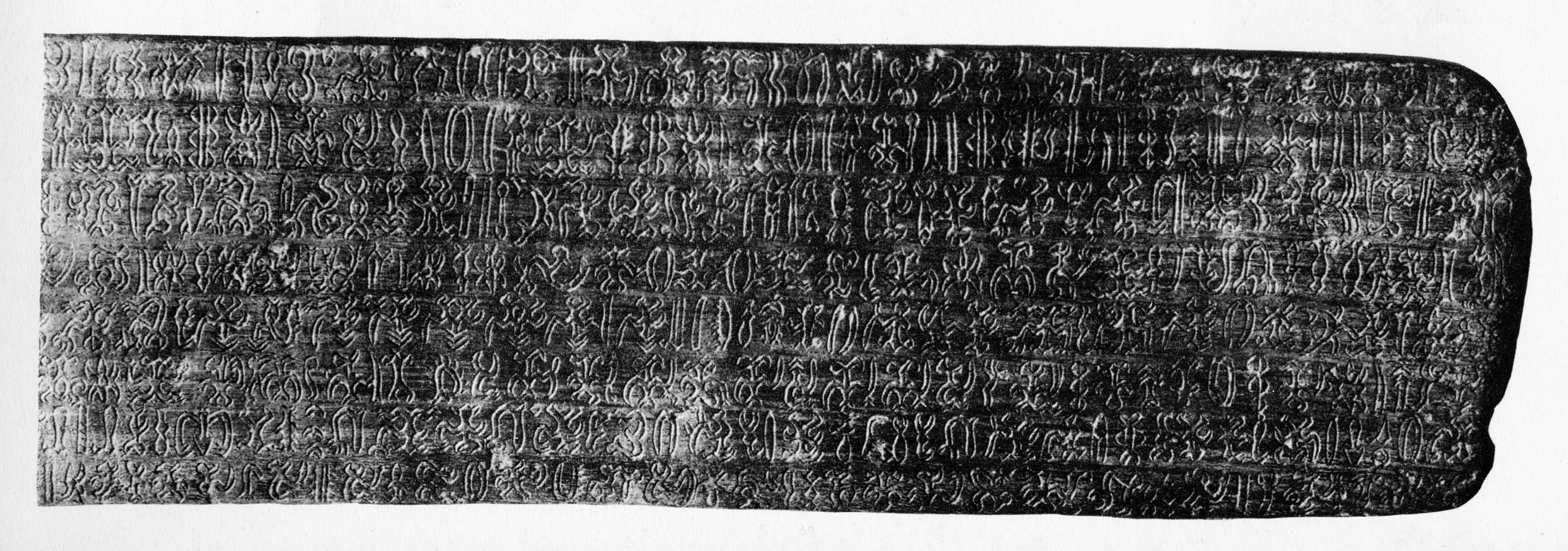
Side a right end
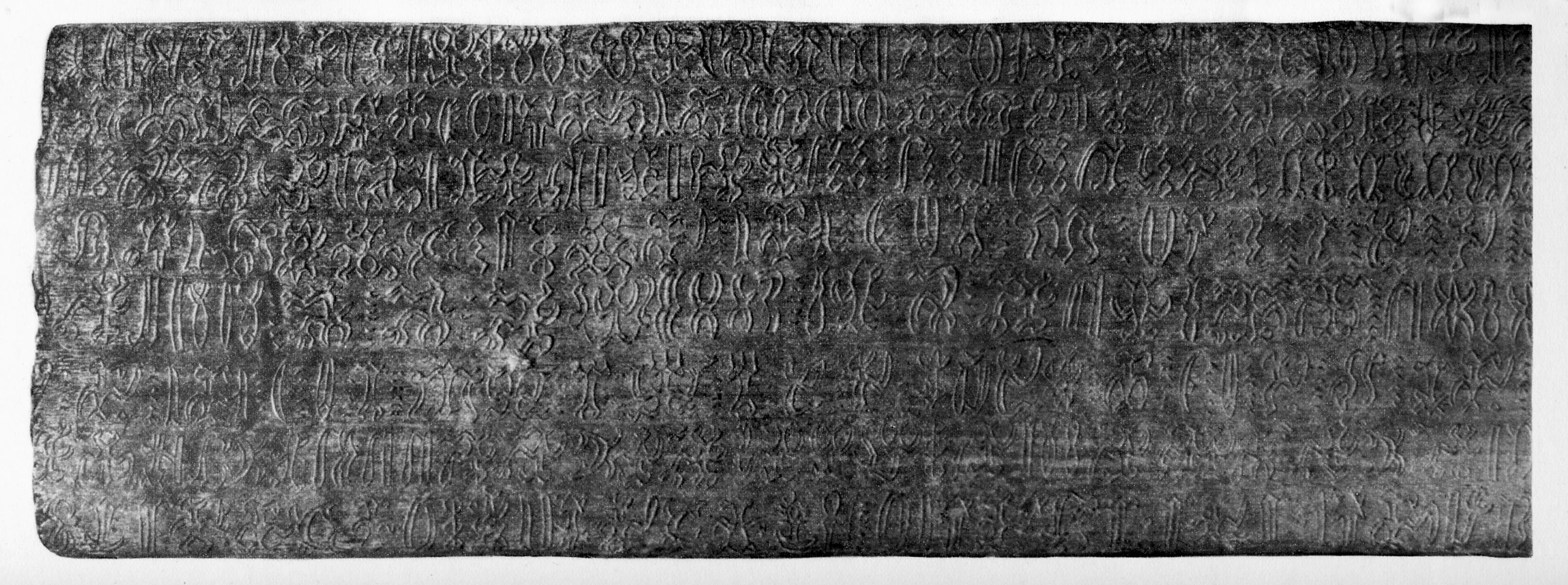
Side b left end

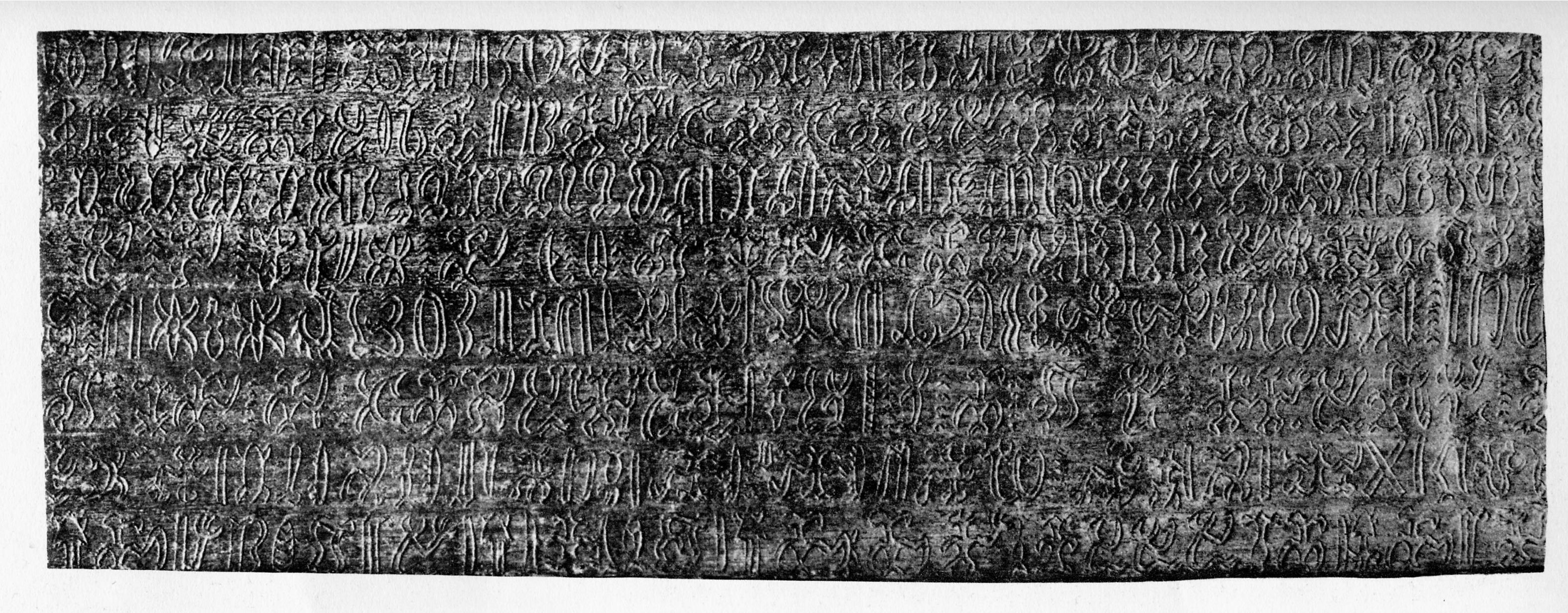
Side b center

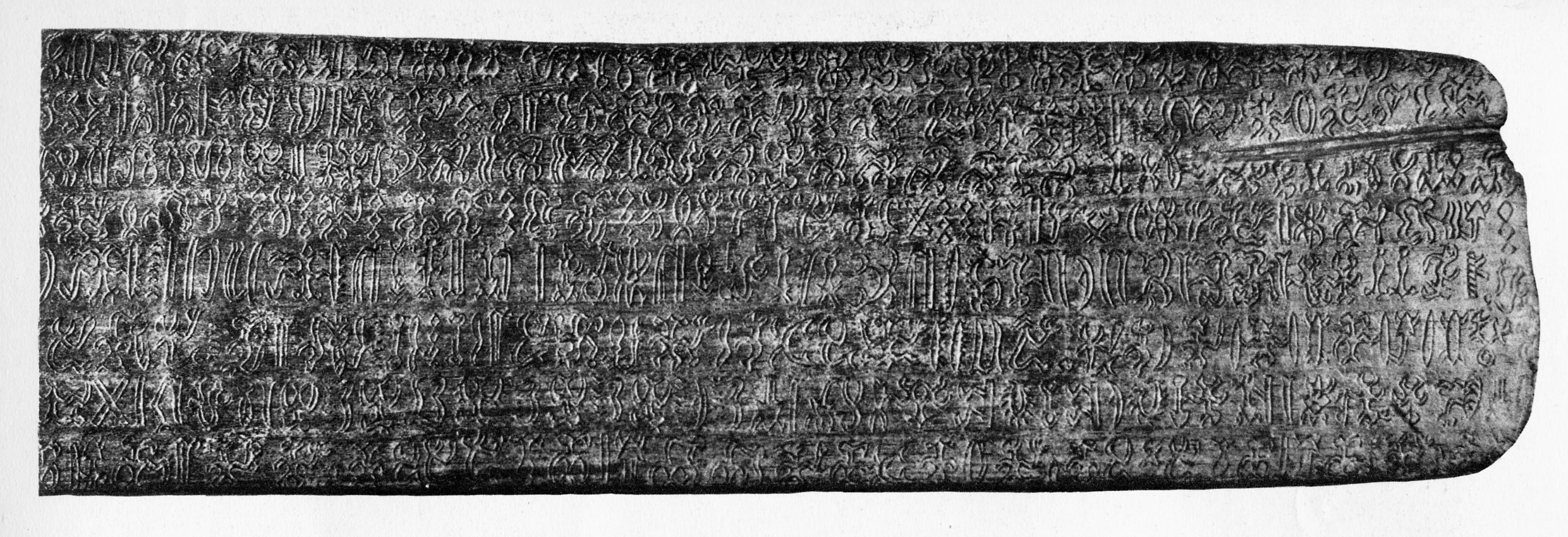
Side b right end
