= Irina Feodorova =

Soviet ethnographer (1931–2010)

Irina Konstantinovna Feodorova Ирина Константиновна Фёдорова
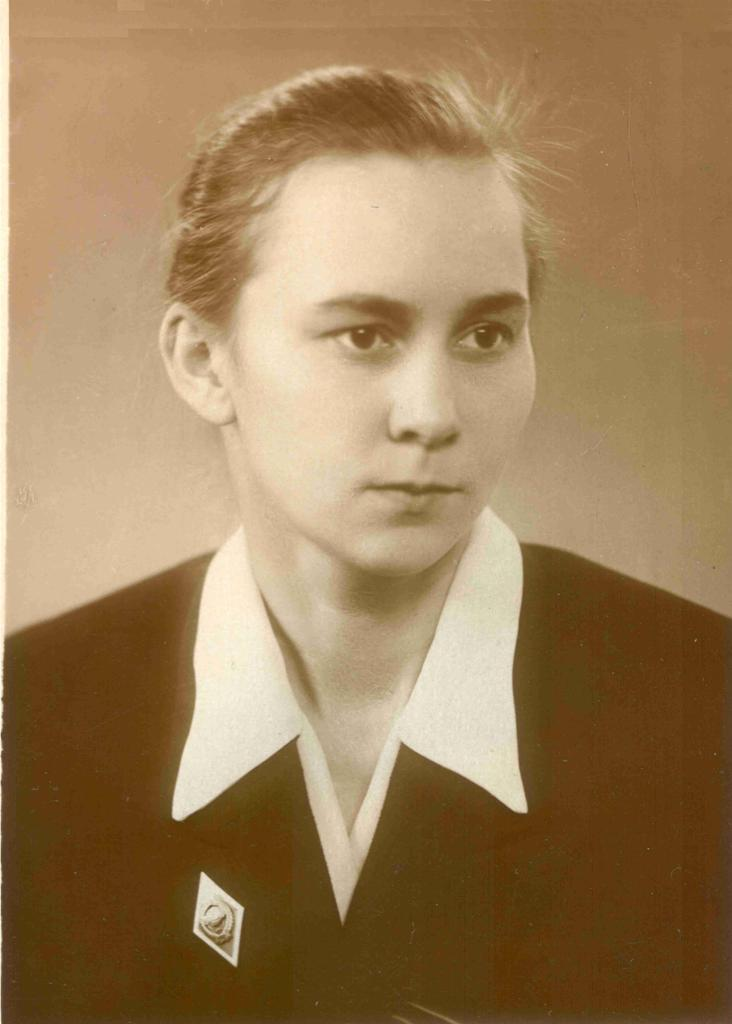
- Irina Fedorova, 1956. Graduated at Leningrad State University (Philology faculty)
- Born: 28 November 1931; Leningrad, USSR
- Died: 7 December 2010 (aged 79); Saint Petersburg, Russia
- Education: Leningrad State University
- Known for: decipherment of rongorongo
- Awards: Premium after N.N.Miklouho-Macklay of Academy of Science of the USSR (1981); Premium of Presidium of the Russian Academy of Science (1995)
- Scientific career
- Fields: history, ethnography, epigraphy, decipherment
- Workplaces: Museum of Anthropology and Ethnography (Russian Academy of Science) named after Peter The Great (Kunstkamera) St. Petersburg

Signature
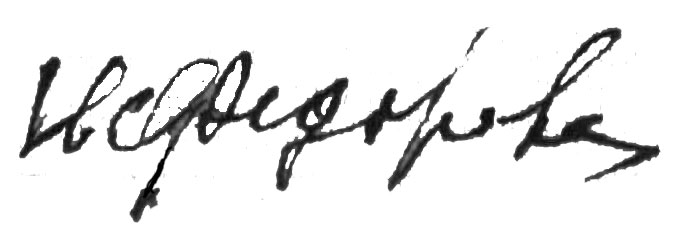

Irina Konstantinovna Feodorova (28 November 1931, Leningrad, USSR – 7 December 2010, Saint Petersburg) was a Soviet historian. Her field of expertise was the ethnography, culture, folklore and language of the people of East Polynesia. Feodorova was a doctor of historical sciences and a leading scientist of the Department of Australia, Oceania and Indonesia at the Museum of Anthropology and Ethnography (Russian Academy of Science) at the Kunstkamera, St. Petersburg, the first Russian museum that was named after Peter the Great. In 1981, Feodorova was given the honour of being named N. N. Miklouho-Maclay Laureate of the Presidium of the Russian Academy of Science.

== Family and personal life ==
Feodorova was born in Leningrad in 1931. Her father, Konstantin Andreevich Mozhajsky, worked in a printing house. Her mother, Lydia Romanovna Steinberg taught German at schools in Leningrad. Feodorova and her husband, Mikhail Lvovich Fedorov, had one daughter, Olga Fedorova.

== Education and early career ==
In 1964, Fedorova participated in the "VII International Congress of Archeology and Ethnography" in Moscow. In 1966, she completed her Candidate thesis entitled, "Folklore of Easter island as a historical source".

== Scientific contributions ==
=== Myths, legends of Easter Island ===
In 1978, Feodorova published her first monograph, "Myths and legends of Easter Island". It is a seminal study of the relics of Rapanui folklore. This publication earned Feodorova the honour of being named the "N. N. Miklouho-Macklay Laureate" of the "Presidium of the Russian Academy of Science" in 1981. In 1987, her work was translated into Hungarian and republished in Budapest. The book includes Feodorova's translations of the Easter Island legends recorded in the 1956 manuscripts of the Norwegian researcher Thor Heyerdahl. Heyerdahl approached the Kunstkamera to help with the translation of the Rapanui language because of the institution's reputation in decipherment. He published the Feodorova translations in his "Works of the Norwegian archeological expedition" (Vol 2, 1965).

=== Myths and Legends of Easter Island ===
Feodorova continued to study Rapanui culture and in 1988 published her second monograph on the subject. This work includes a basic dictionary of Rapanui language (direct and reverse). It also includes a translation of the 1974 publication of Rapanui text by the German researcher, Thomas Barthel.

=== Easter Island. Sketches of culture of the 19th and 20th centuries ===
In 1994, Feodorova gained her Doctorate with the book, Easter island. Sketches of the culture of the nineteenth and twentieth centuries The book examines the history of the population of Easter Island; the ethnogenesis of its inhabitants; and theories about the original ancient civilisation. Feodorova analysed the culture of the indigenous people of Rapanui including their folklore, language, chanting connected with string games, features of a tattoo and the stone statues. She examined the meaning of funeral braids and carved wooden figures.

=== Kohau Rongorongo tablets from Kunstkamera ===
In 1995, Feodorova published a third monograph. It contained her attempt at deciphering the two rongorongo tablets in the Kunstkamera. This work earned Feodorova the Premium of the Presidium of the Russian Academy of Sciences. The monograph presents the full texts and Feodorova's translations of two Rapanui plates from the Kunstkamera collection.

=== Peer review of Kohau Rongorongo script research ===
Feodorova's studies of the Kohau RongoRongo script date from the 1960s. More rigorous than most attempts, she restricts each glyph to a single logographic reading. However, the results make little sense as texts. For example, the Mamari calendar, the single rongorongo text that can be read, contains no calendrical information in Feodorova's decipherment, but reads instead like the following sample:

a root, a root, a root, a root, a root, a root [that is, a lot of roots], a tuber, he took, he cut a potato tuber, he dug up yam shoots, a yam tuber, a potato tuber, a tuber,

which even Fedorova characterized as "worthy of a maniac". What Feodorova translates as "root", the small community of rongorongo specialists agree is instead a calendrical night. Konstantin Pozdniakov concluded that Feodorova's translations "are not accompanied by the least justification".

=== Speaking Tablets From Easter Island ===
In 2001, Feodorova published her attempts at decoding, reading, and translating all the examples of ancient Rapanui text from museums around the world. This work includes the "Tomenika Tau a Ure" tablet recorded in the manuscript of Francis Mazier.

=== Missionaries of Easter Island ===
Feodorova's fifth book, Missionaries of Easter Island (2004) is devoted to the history of the first Catholic Rapanui mission and the relationship of the missionaries to original Rapanui culture. It uses rare archival materials and publications of the Catholic mission, the "Congregation de Sacres Coeurs" (Congregation of the Sacred Hearts of Jesus and Mary). Feodorova demonstrates the positive role the missionaries played in Rapanui in the 19th century in the study and preservation of the indigenous population and their culture.

=== Other work ===
==== Articles ====
Feodorova has contributed many articles to the international scientific community. Her focus is the ethnography, culture, folklore and language of the inhabitants of Easter Island. She has also written about the inhabitants of other islands of Polynesia such as Hawaii, New Zealand, Marquises, Mangarewa, Tahiti, Samoa and Tonga. Feodorova's other studies concern the origin of people of Oceania; Pacific oceanic contacts; the role of the Areoi (a society of secret warriors) in Polynesia; the linguistics of Polynesian and American Indian languages. She has also researched petroglyphs, zodiac signs, ancient calendars, paleoastronomy, toponyms, terms of relationship and social systems, material culture, mythology, religious views, magic fairy tales, games, tattoos and the meanings of Polynesian sculptural and carved images.

==== The way of the ancestors ====
From 1995, Feodorova was a member of the informal cultural group "The way of the ancestors". The group researched and published the history and the work of the first Russian round-the-world expedition (1803−1806). As part of the Russian world expedition, A. J. Krusenstern in the "Nadeshda" and J. F. Lisjansky in the "Neva" sailed to the islands of East Polynesia, including Easter Island, Marquesas and Hawaii. Feodorova contributed to the scientific album, Around the world with Krusenstern (2005) and was the co-author in the collective monograph, "Russians in the 'Silent sea'" (2006). In 2001, the memorial edition, " The Russian Geographical Society: 165 years of service to Fatherland". Feodorova studied the diaries and letters of I. K. Horner, F. I. Shemelin, M. I. Ratmanov and other participants of the first Russian round-the-world voyage.

=== Unpublished work ===
Feodorova's last work "The Semantics of sculptural and carved images in subjects of the Polynesian collections of Museum of Anthropology and Ethnography (Russian Academy of Science)" and many other works is unpublished.

== Bibliography of works by I. K. Fedorova ==
1. Myths, legends of Easter island. 1978. Translation: Husvet-szigeti mitoszok... Budapest, 1987.
2. Myths and legends of Easter island. 1988.
3. Easter island. Sketches of culture XVIII-19th centuries. 1993.
4. Kohau rongorongo tablets from Kunstkamera. 1995.
5. «Speaking tablets» from Easter island. Decoding, reading, translation. 2001..
6. Missionaries of Easter island. 2004.
7. «Russians in «the Silent sea»» 2006. (In the co-authorship with O.M. Fedorova).
