= Rongorongo text B =

One of the undeciphered texts of Easter Island

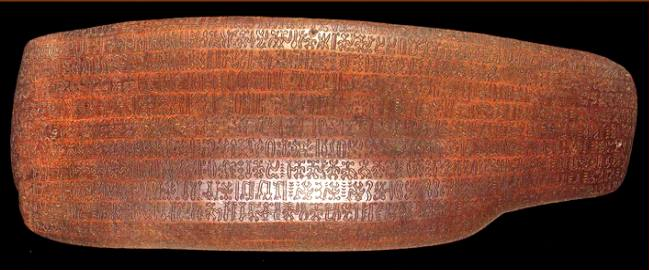

Rongorongo is a system of glyphs discovered in the 19th century on Easter Island that appears to be writing or proto-writing. Text B of the rongorongo corpus, also known as Aruku Kurenga, is one of two dozen surviving rongorongo texts.

Aruku Kurenga provided part of the "Jaussen List", a failed key of rongorongo glyphs. Jaussen's informant, Metoro Tauꞌa Ure, "read" the tablet correctly from the bottom left of the recto, but the transcription of his reading has been of no use in understanding the script.

== Other names ==
B is the standard designation, from Barthel (1958). Fischer (1997) refers to it as RR4.

== Location ==
General archives of the Padri dei Sacri Cuori (SSCC), Casa Generalizia, Via Rivarone 85, I-00166 Rome, Italy.

Reproductions are located at the SSCC, the Bishop Museum, Honolulu, the Cinquantenaire, Brussels, and the Dresden Museum of Ethnology.

== Description ==
In excellent condition. Oblong, fluted, with rounded edges and one end narrowed with an indentation, 41 × 15.2 × 2.3 cm, made of Pacific rosewood (Orliac 2005). Aruku Kurenga is warped, and may have been made from a piece of driftwood. There is one hole in the center, and two on the top and right end, viewing the verso, for hanging the tablet.

Métraux (1940: 393–4) considered Aruku Kurenga to be one of the finest rongorongo tablets:

The skill displayed by the artist is masterly; all the signs are incised with a freedom, a keen appreciation of proportion, and a vigor that only an expert artist could accomplish. There is a good sense of movement and a harmonious combination of conventionalized and naturalistic elements.

== Provenance ==
One of Jaussen's tablets, Aruku Kurenga was apparently collected on Easter Island by Fathers Roussel and Zumbohm in 1870 and sent to him in Tahiti. It was sent to the headquarters of the Congrégation des Sacrés-Coeurs et de l'Adoration (SSCC) in Paris, where it was deposited in the Missionary Museum, either by Jaussen in 1888 or by the French navy in 1892 after his death. In 1905 it was moved to the SSCC museum in Braine-le-Comte, Belgium. In 1953, when the SSCC relocated to Grottaferrata, near Rome, this tablet was sent to the old Paris headquarters. It was returned shortly after the SSCC moved their headquarters to Rome in 1964. In 1974 the SSCC moved to its permanent headquarters in Rome.

== Contents ==
Fischer believes that Aruku Kurenga may be a collation of several different texts.

Butinov and Knorozov (1956) noted three repeating sequences of text. "Evidently, this is one and the same text, given in three variants".

== Text ==
There are ten lines of glyphs recto, twelve verso, for a total of ~ 1,290 glyphs.

Due to the constricted shape of one end, the lines of text are not parallel. On the verso, line 2 is reduced in height after the fifth glyph, and line three stops at that point, so that the beginning of line 4 runs directly atop line 2. (See 'Verso, right end' in the gallery below.)

Note: Pozdniakov includes B in his comments on the reading order of A, suggesting that the sides of B should be assigned labels a and b rather than recto and verso.

Barthel

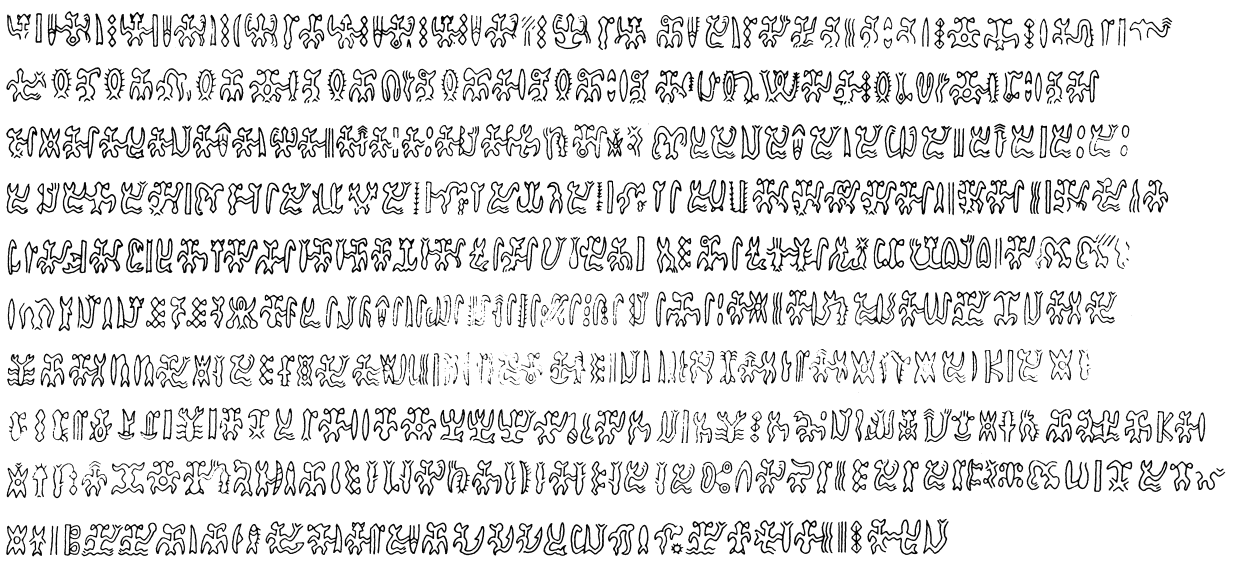
Recto, as traced by Barthel. The lines have been rearranged to reflect English reading order: Br1 at top, Br10 at bottom.
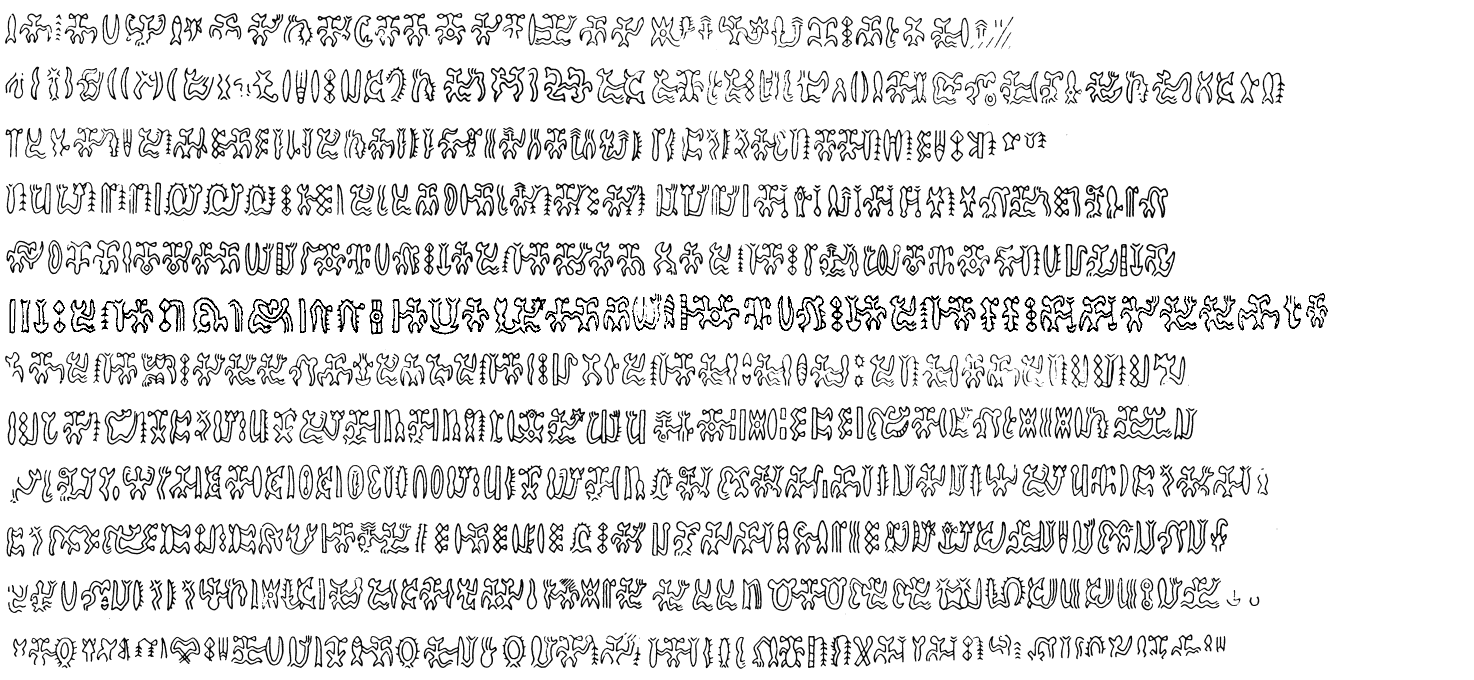
Verso, as traced by Barthel: Bv1 at top, Bv12 at bottom.

Fischer

== Image gallery ==
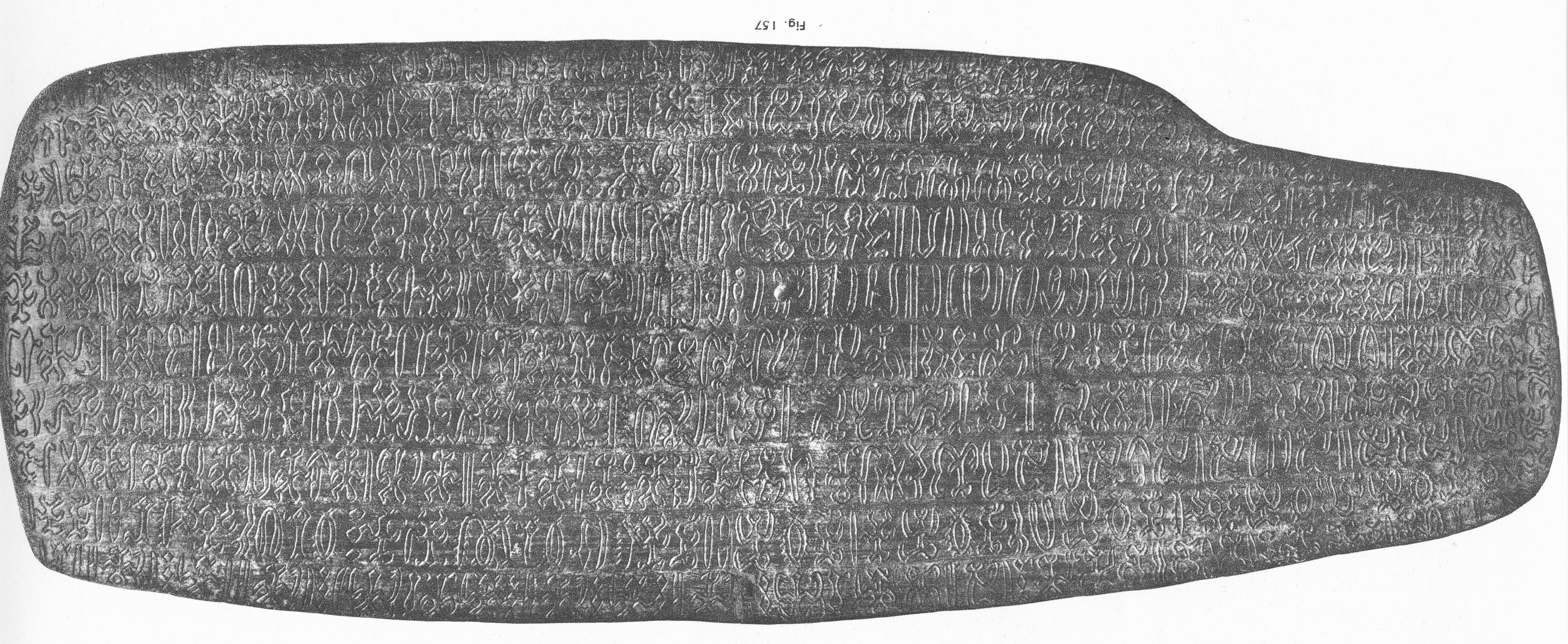
Recto

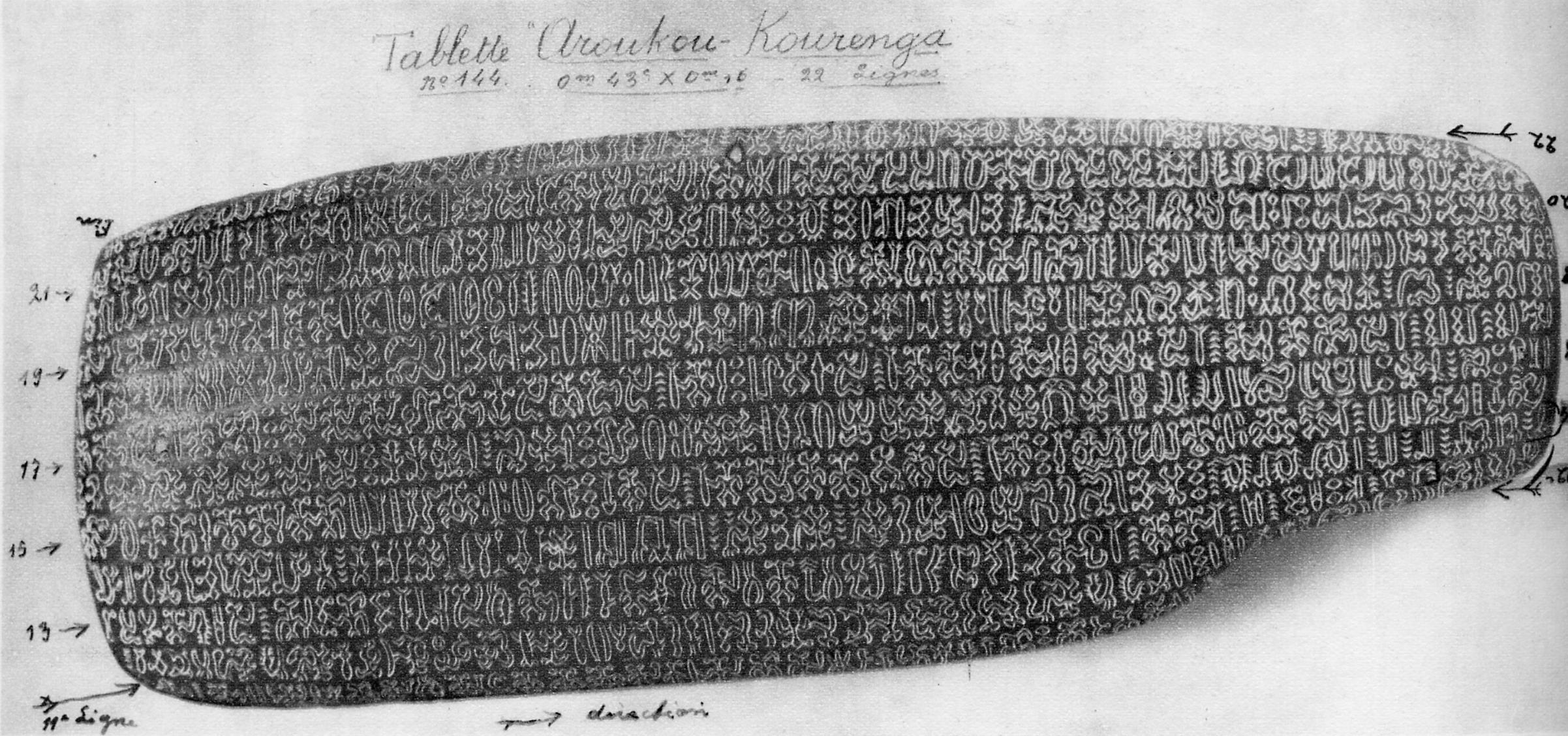
Verso

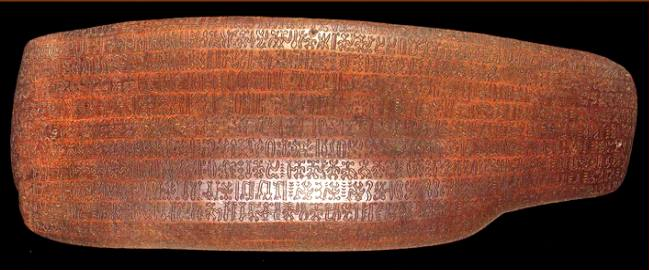
Verso, color

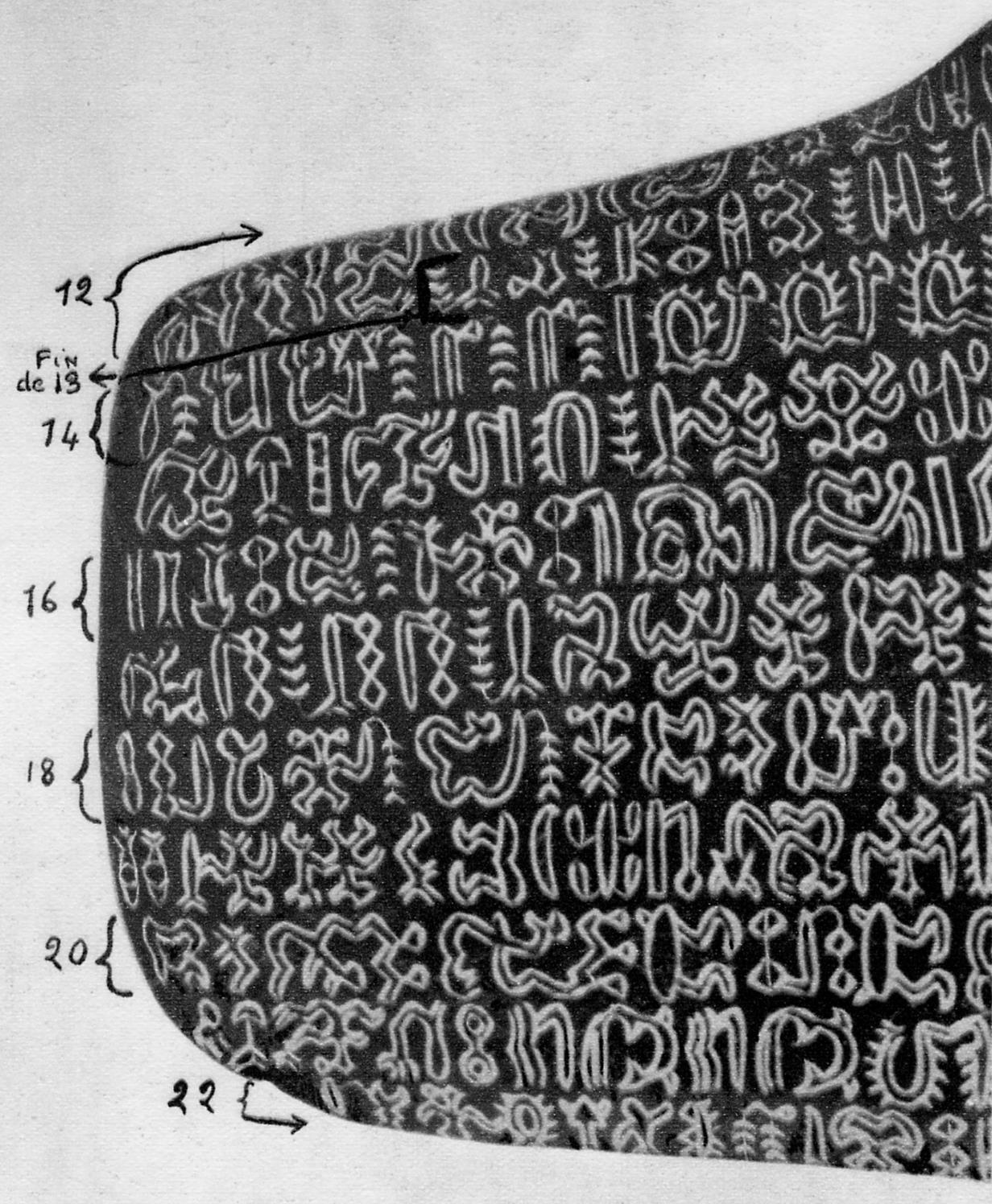
Verso, right end
