= Jacques Guy =

Jacques Guy (born 23 November 1944) is a French linguist, living in Australia since 1968. He started undergraduate studies at the École des Langues Orientales (School of Oriental Languages, renamed since to the Institut national des langues et civilisations orientales) in Paris, France, focusing on Chinese, Japanese and Tahitian. He wrote his Ph.D. thesis, under the auspices of the Australian National University, on Sakao, a language of Espiritu Santo (located in the island group then called the New Hebrides and now called Vanuatu).

Following this, he turned his attention towards automatic text manipulation and digital taxonomy, working from 1985 at the AI research lab of Telecom Australia (Telstra) in Clayton, a suburb of Melbourne. He remained at Telstra until 1998. His work led him to take an interest in two linguistic enigmas: Rongorongo and the Voynich manuscript.
