= Florentin-Étienne Jaussen =

French-born Tahitian bishop

- Bishop
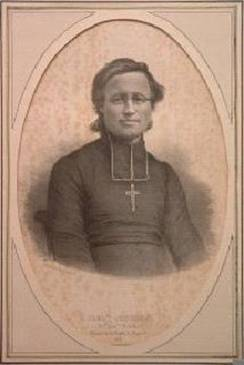
- Étienne Florentin Jaussen, also known as Tepano
- Appointed: Titular Bishop of Titularbistum Axieri
- Successor: Marie-Joseph Verdier
- Other posts: Apostolic Vicar of Tahiti (May 9, 1848 ― Feb 12, 1884)

Orders
- Ordination: 1840
- Consecration: August 27, 1848 by Rafael Valentín Valdivieso, Archbishop of Santiago

Florentin-Étienne Jaussen, SS.CC., (2 April 1815 – 9 September 1891) was the first bishop of Tahiti and the man who brought the rongorongo script of Easter Island to the world's attention. In the 1860s Bishop Jaussen was responsible for ending the slave raids on Easter Island.

== Biography ==
Jaussen was born in Rocles, France. He was Vicar Apostolic of Tahiti and titular bishop of Axieri from 9 May 1848 until 12 February 1884, when he resigned. During this time he went by the name Tepano, the Tahitian pronunciation of Etienne in its original Greek form Stephanos.

He ordained the first native priest of Eastern Polynesia Tiripone Mama Taira Putairi, on 24 December 1874.

Jaussen worked to establish Catholicism on the island and managed to construct the first cathedral in Papeete in 1851. In 1855, he purchased a large estate near the city to ensure economic independence for the missions and developed the cultivation of coconut, sugarcane, and vines, among other activities. He also raised sheep and cattle and established beehives for apiculture.

As a bishop and chaplain of the Pacific naval division, he traveled across the ocean, from the Society Islands to the Marquesas, and from Easter Island to the Tuamotu, where he introduced the coconut tree, previously unknown there.

On Easter Island, although it was not French, he intervened with the Peruvian government to stop raids and slavery. In 1868, in gratitude, Easter Islanders residing in Tahiti gave him a strange wooden tablet with curious inscriptions. Jaussen asked missionaries on the island to find more, resulting in the collection of five tablets. He studied these and believed them to be genuine hieroglyphs in a pictographic script no longer deciphered by the locals. The script is boustrophedon, meaning lines alternate between reading left to right and right to left. Together with Metoro, a learned Pascuan, he believed it to be magical formulas and fragments of sacred and profane chants.

Jaussen managed to establish a chronology of the island's kings spanning a thousand years and proposed a translated repertoire of the most important ideograms. Although his translations are now questioned, Jaussen succeeded in creating nine categories covering gods, humans, land, sea, animals, plants, objects, actions, and composite signs.

Following the destruction caused by the usurper adventurer Jean-Baptiste Dutrou-Bornier, he evacuated the missionaries from Easter Island in 1871. In 1884, he retired from his episcopal duties and settled in Arue, in the Papenoʻo parish, where he died in 1891.

He died on 9 September 1891 at the episcopal palace in Tahiti.

== Works ==
He is known for his research on Rapa Nui, grammar studies, dictionaries, a catechism, and a holy history in Tahitian, as well as:

- Letter on Easter Island (1873), in Annales des Sacrés-cœurs, 1879, p. 83-94
- Easter Island, History and Writing, in Bulletin de géographie historique, vol.2, 1893, p. 240-270 (posthumous paper written by Father Alazard based on Jaussen's notes) (Read online).

== Bibliography ==
- Steven R. Fischer, Rongorongo: The Easter Island Script: History, Traditions, Texts, 1997
- C. and M. Orliac, Des dieux regardent les étoiles. Les derniers secrets de l'île de Pâques, 1988
- Numa Broc, Dictionnaire des Explorateurs français du XIX^{e} siècle, T.4, Océanie, CTHS, 2003, p. 208

== See also ==
- Rongo-Rongo

== See also ==
- Decipherment of rongorongo § Jaussen

Catholic Church titles
Preceded by Vicar Apostolic of Oriental Oceania; Étienne Jérôme Rouchouze	Vicar Apostolic of Tahiti; 1848–1884	Succeeded by Marie-Joseph Verdier
