= Thomas Barthel =

German ethnologist and epigrapher

- Born: 4 January 1923; Berlin, Germany
- Died: 3 April 1997 (aged 74); Tübingen, Baden-Württemberg, Germany

Academic background
- Education: University of Hamburg

Academic work
- Era: 1959–1988
- Institutions: University of Tübingen

Thomas Sylvester Barthel (4 January 1923 – 3 April 1997) was a German ethnologist and epigrapher who is best known for cataloguing the undeciphered rongorongo script of Easter Island.

== Life and career ==
Barthel was born on 4 January 1923, in Berlin, and graduated from secondary school in 1940. During World War II, he worked as a cryptographer for the Wehrmacht. After the war, he studied folklore, geography, and prehistory in Berlin, Hamburg, and Leipzig. He received his doctorate in Hamburg in 1952 with a thesis on Mayan writing. From 1953 to 1956, he was a Fellow of the Deutsche Forschungsgemeinschaft, in 1957 a lecturer in Hamburg, and from 4 July 1957 to 1 February 1958 he was a guest researcher with the Institute for Easter Island Studies at the University of Chile.

In order to document rongorongo, Barthel visited most of the museums which housed the tablets, of which he made pencil rubbings. With this data he compiled the first corpus of the script, which he published as Grundlagen zur Entzifferung der Osterinselschrift in 1958. He was the first scholar to correctly identify anything in the texts: He showed that two lines in the Mamari tablet encode calendrical information.

In 1959, Barthel became Associate Professor of Ethnology at the University of Tübingen, and from 1964 to 1988 he was Professor of Ethnology. His primary research was in the folklore of the Americas. He bequeathed his rongorongo data to the CEIPP (Centre d'Études de l'Îles de Pâques et de la Polynésie), which is engaged in verifying and expanding on his work.

Barthel was also active in the mid-twentieth century attempts to decipher the Maya script, the 'hieroglyphic' writing system of the pre-Columbian Maya civilization in Mesoamerica. He was one of the first to analyse emblem glyphs in detail and in terms of their political and hierarchical associations. His proposed identification of four major or prime emblem glyphs was later expanded upon by Joyce Marcus, and the Barthel-Marcus quadripartite partitioning of Classic era Maya sites into four regional capitals and an associated hierarchy of four levels of site importance, became an influential concept in Mayanist research.

Along with J. Eric S. Thompson, Barthel was a strong critic of the "phonetic approach" to Maya decipherment, and held the view that the Maya script lacked phoneticism and did not constitute a "true" writing system. In particular, Barthel stood solidly against the phonetic decipherment methodology put forward in the early 1950s by the Soviet epigrapher Yuri Knorozov, who like Barthel had also worked on both the Maya and rongorongo scripts. At a 1956 meeting of the International Congress of Americanists in Copenhagen attended by Knorozov, Barthel's criticism of the phonetic approach contributed to the continuing dismissal of Knorozov's ideas—ideas that would later be proved essentially correct when the phonetic approach championed by Knorozov provided the breakthrough in Maya decipherment from the 1970s onwards. Barthel and Knorozov would remain at-odds for the remainder of their respective careers.

== Personal life ==
Barthel was married three times and had four children. He died on 3 April 1997, aged 74, in Tübingen

== Published works ==
- 1958a. Grundlagen zur Entzifferung der Osterinselschrift. Hamburg : Cram, de Gruyter.
- 1958b. "The 'Talking Boards' of Easter Island." Scientific American, 198:61-68
- 1971. Pre-contact Writing in Oceania. In: Current Trends in Linguistics 8:1165-1186. Den Haag, Paris: Mouton.
- 1978. The Eighth Land: The Polynesian Discovery & Settlement of Easter Island. Honolulu: the University Press of Hawaii.
- 1990. "Wege durch die Nacht (Rongorongo-Studien auf dem Santiagostab)", in Esen-Baur, Heide-Margaret (ed.), State and Perspectives of Scientific Research in Easter Island Culture. Courier Forschungsinstitute Senckeberg 125. Frankfurt am Mein: Senckenbergische Naturforschende Gesellschaft, 73–112. ISBN 3-510-61140-3
