= Rongorongo =

System of glyphs from Easter Island

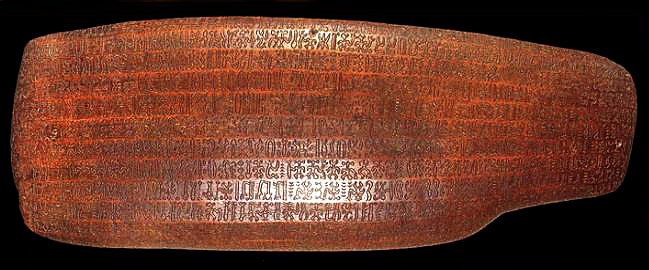
- Script type: Undeciphered
- Period: Time of creation unknown; writing ceased and most tablets lost or destroyed in the 1860s
- Direction: Reversed boustrophedon
- Languages: Rapa Nui

ISO 15924
- ISO 15924: Roro (620), Rongorongo

Rongorongo (/ˈrɒŋɡoʊˈrɒŋɡoʊ/ or /ˈrɒŋoʊˈrɒŋoʊ/; Rapa Nui: roŋoroŋo [ˈɾoŋoˈɾoŋo]) is a system of glyphs discovered in the 19th century on Easter Island that has the appearance of writing or proto-writing. Numerous attempts at decipherment have been made, but none have been completely successful. Although some calendrical and what might prove to be genealogical information has been identified, none of the glyphs can actually be read. If rongorongo does prove to be writing and to be an independent invention, it would be one of very few inventions of writing in human history.

Two dozen wooden objects bearing rongorongo inscriptions, some heavily weathered, burned, or otherwise damaged, were collected in the late 19th century and are now scattered in museums and private collections. None remain on Easter Island. The objects are mostly tablets shaped from irregular pieces of wood, sometimes driftwood, but include a chieftain's staff, a tangata manu statuette, and two reimiro ornaments. There are also a few petroglyphs which may include short rongorongo inscriptions. Oral history suggests that only a small elite was ever literate and that the tablets were sacred.

Authentic rongorongo texts are written in alternating directions, a system called reverse boustrophedon. In a third of the tablets, the lines of text are inscribed in shallow fluting carved into the wood. The glyphs themselves are outlines of human, animal, plant, artifact and geometric forms. Many of the human and animal figures, such as glyphs 200 and 280, have characteristic protuberances on each side of the head, possibly representing eyes.

Individual texts are conventionally known by a single uppercase letter and a name, such as Tablet C, the Mamari Tablet. The (somewhat variable) names may be descriptive or indicate where the object is kept, as in the Oar, the Snuffbox, the Small Santiago Tablet, and the Santiago Staff.

== Etymology and variant names ==
Rongorongo is the modern name for the inscriptions. In the Rapa Nui language, roŋoroŋo or rogorogo means "to recite, to declaim, to chant out". (Note: Englert defines rogorogo as "recitar, declamar, leer cantando" (to recite, declaim, read chanting), and tagata rogorogo (rongorongo man) as "hombre que sabía leer los textos de los kōhau rogorogo, o sea, de las tabletas con signos para la recitación" (a man who could read the texts of the kōhau rogorogo, that is, of the tablets bearing signs for recitation). Roŋoroŋo is the reduplication of roŋo "recado, orden o mandato, mensaje, noticia" (a message, order, notice); tagata rogo is a "mensajero" (a messenger). Kōhau are defined as "líneas tiradas a hilo hau sobre tabletas o palos para la inscripción de signos" (lines drawn with a string (hau) on tablets or sticks for the inscription of signs). The Rapanui word roŋo has cognates in most other Austronesian languages, from Malay dengar /dəŋar/ to Fijian rogoca /roŋoða/ and Hawaiian lono, where these words have such meanings as "to listen", "to hear", etc.)

The original name—or perhaps description—of the script is said to have been kōhau motu mo roŋoroŋo, "lines incised for chanting out", shortened to kōhau roŋoroŋo or "lines [for] chanting out". There are also said to have been more specific names for the texts based on their topic. For example, the kōhau taꞌu ("lines of years") were annals, the kōhau ika ("lines of fishes") were lists of persons killed in war (ika "fish" was homophonous with or used figuratively for "war casualty"), and the kōhau raŋa "lines of fugitives" were lists of war refugees.

Some authors have understood the taꞌu in kōhau taꞌu to refer to a separate form of writing distinct from roŋoroŋo. Barthel recorded that "The Islanders had another writing (the so-called 'taꞌu script') which recorded their annals and other secular matters, but this has disappeared." But Steven Roger Fischer writes that "the taꞌu was originally a type of roŋoroŋo inscription. In the 1880s, a group of elders invented a derivative 'script' [also] called taꞌu with which to decorate carvings in order to increase their trading value. It is a primitive imitation of roŋoroŋo." An alleged third script, the mama or vaꞌevaꞌe described in some mid-20th-century publications, was "an early twentieth-century geometric [decorative] invention".

== Form and construction ==
The Small Santiago Tablet (tablet G) clearly shows the fluting along which the glyphs were carved.

The forms of the glyphs are standardized contours of living organisms and geometric designs about one centimeter high. The wooden tablets are irregular in shape and, in many instances, fluted (tablets B, E, G, H, O, Q, and possibly T), with the glyphs carved in shallow channels running the length of the tablets, as can be seen in the image of tablet G at right. It is thought that irregular and often blemished pieces of wood were used in their entirety rather than squared off due to the scarcity of wood on the island.

=== Writing media ===
To maximize space, the text wraps around the edge of tablet K.

Except for a few possible glyphs cut in stone (see petroglyphs), and one possibility on barkcloth, all surviving secure texts are inscribed in wood. According to tradition, the tablets were made of toromiro wood. However, Catherine Orliac (2005b) examined seven objects (tablets B, C, G, H, K, Q, and reimiro L) with stereo optical and scanning electron microscopes and determined that all were instead made from Pacific rosewood (Thespesia populnea); the same identification had been made for tablet M in 1934. This 15-meter (50 ft) tree, known as "Pacific rosewood" for its color and called makoꞌi in Rapanui, is used for sacred groves and carvings throughout eastern Polynesia and was evidently brought to Easter Island by the first settlers. However, not all the wood was native: Orliac (2007) established that tablets N, P, and S were made of South African yellowwood (Podocarpus latifolius) and therefore that the wood had arrived with Western contact. Fischer describes P as "a damaged and reshapen European or American oar", as are A (which is European ash, Fraxinus excelsior) and V; notes that wood from the wreck of a Western boat was said to have been used for many tablets; and that both P and S had been recycled as planking for a Rapanui driftwood canoe, suggesting that by that time the tablets had little value to the islanders as texts. Several texts, including O, are carved on gnarled driftwood. The fact that the islanders were reduced to inscribing driftwood, and were regardless extremely economical in their use of wood, may have had consequences for the structure of the script, such as the abundance of ligatures and potentially a telegraphic style of writing that would complicate textual analysis.

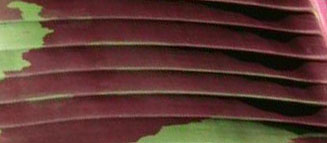
Rongorongo tablets may have been influenced by writing on banana leaves like this one.

William J. Thomson reported a calabash, now lost, that had been found in a tomb and was "covered with hieroglyphics similar to those found on the incised tablets." The fraudulent Raŋitoki fragment was presented as a piece of bark cloth skirt decorated with rongorongo.

Oral tradition holds that, because of the great value of wood, only expert scribes used it, while pupils wrote on banana leaves. German ethnologist Thomas Barthel believed that carving on wood was a secondary development in the evolution of the script based on an earlier stage of incising banana leaves or the sheaths of the banana trunk with a bone stylus, and that the medium of leaves was retained not only for lessons but to plan and compose the texts of the wooden tablets. He found experimentally that the glyphs were quite visible on banana leaves due to the sap that emerged from the cuts and dried on the surface. However, when the leaves themselves dried, they became brittle and would not have survived for long.

Barthel speculated that the banana leaf might even have served as a prototype for the tablets, with the fluted surface of the tablets an emulation of the veined structure of a leaf:

Practical experiments with the material available on [Easter Island] have proved that the above-mentioned parts of the banana tree are not only an ideal writing material, but that in particular a direct correspondence exists between the height of the lines of writing and the distance between the veins on the leaves and stems of the banana tree. The classical inscriptions can be arranged in two groups according to the height of the lines (10–12 mm vs. 15 mm); this corresponds to the natural disposition of the veins on the banana stem (on average 10 mm in the lower part of a medium-sized tree) or on the banana leaf ([...] maximum 15mm).

— Barthel 1971:1169

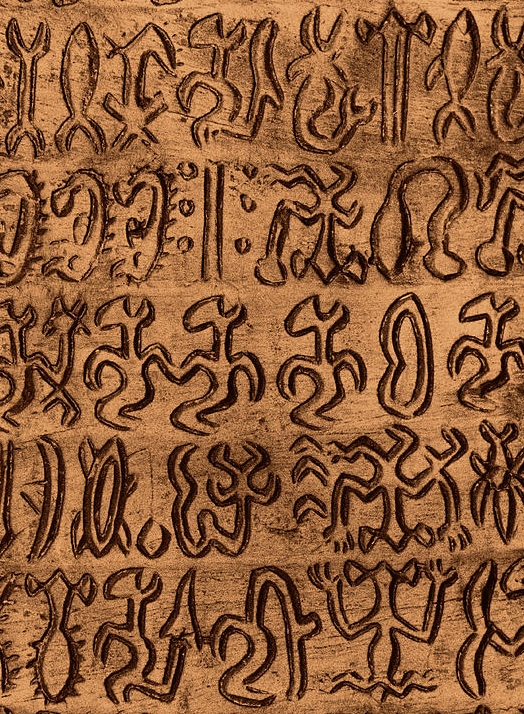
A closeup of the verso of the Small Santiago Tablet, showing parts of lines 3 (bottom) to 7 (top). The glyphs of lines 3, 5, and 7 are right-side up, while those of lines 4 and 6 are up-side down.

=== Direction of writing ===
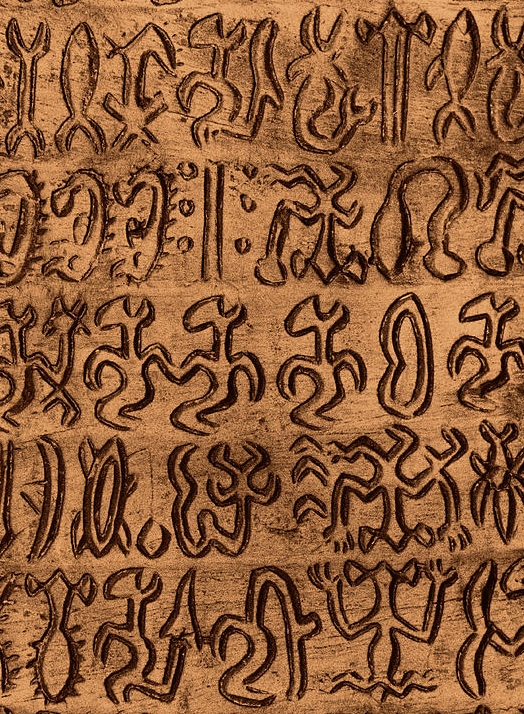
A closeup of the verso of the Small Santiago Tablet, showing parts of lines 3 (bottom) to 7 (top). The glyphs of lines 3, 5, and 7 are right-side up, while those of lines 4 and 6 are up-side down.

Rongorongo glyphs were written in reverse boustrophedon, left to right and bottom to top. That is, the reader begins at the bottom left-hand corner of a tablet, reads a line from left to right, then rotates the tablet 180 degrees to continue on the next line. When reading one line, the lines above and below it would appear upside down, as can be seen in the image at leftabove.

However, the writing continues onto the second side of a tablet at the point where it finishes off the first, so if the first side has an odd number of lines, as is the case with tablets K, N, P, and Q, the second will start at the upper left-hand corner, and the direction of writing shifts to top to bottom.

Larger tablets and staves may have been read without turning, if the reader were able to read upside-down.

The direction of writing was determined by such clues as glyphs that twist as the line changes direction, glyphs that were squashed to fit in at the end of a text, and, when a particular tablet does not have such clues, parallel passages between tablets.

=== Writing instruments ===
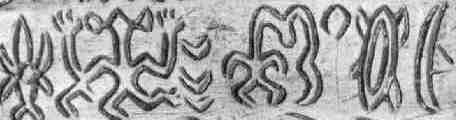
Most of Gv4 was carved with a shark tooth. However, the two parts of the glyph second from right ( and) are connected by a faint bent hair-line that may have been inscribed with obsidian. (The chevrons are also linked by such a line, too faint to be seen here, which connects them to the hand of the human figure.)

According to oral tradition, scribes used obsidian flakes or small shark teeth, presumably the hafted tools still used to carve wood in Polynesia, to flute and polish the tablets and then to incise the glyphs. The glyphs are most commonly composed of deep smooth cuts, though superficial hair-line cuts are also found. In the closeup image at right, a glyph is composed of two parts connected by a hair-line cut; this is a typical convention for this shape. Several researchers, including Barthel, believe that these superficial cuts were made by obsidian, and that the texts were carved in a two-stage process, first sketched with obsidian and then deepened and finished with a worn shark tooth. The remaining hair-line cuts were then either errors, design conventions (as at right), or decorative embellishments. (Note: Barthel tested this experimentally, and Dederen (1993) reproduced several tablets in this fashion. Fischer comments, On the Large St. Petersburg ([P]r3) [...] the original tracing with an obsidian flake describes a bird's bill identical to a foregoing one; but when incising, the scribe reduced this bill to a much more bulbous shape [...] since he now was working with the different medium of a shark's tooth. There are many such scribal quirks on the "Large St. Petersburg" [tablet P]. The rongorongo script is a "contour script" (Barthel 1955:360) [...] with various internal or external lines, circles, dashes or dots added [...] Often such features exist only in the hair-line pre-etching effected by obsidian flakes and not incised with a shark's tooth. This is particularly evident on the "Small Vienna" [tablet N].) Vertical strings of chevrons or lozenges, for example, are typically connected with hair-line cuts, as can be seen repeatedly in the closeup of one end of tablet B below. However, Barthel was told that the last literate Rapanui king, Ngaꞌara, sketched out the glyphs in soot applied with a fish bone and then engraved them with a shark tooth.

Tablet N, on the other hand, shows no sign of shark teeth. Haberlandt noticed that the glyphs of this text appear to have been incised with a sharpened bone, as evidenced by the shallowness and width of the grooves. N also "displays secondary working with obsidian flakes to elaborate details within the finished contour lines. No other rongo-rongo inscription reveals such graphic extravagance".

Other tablets appear to have been cut with a steel blade, often rather crudely. Although steel knives were available after the arrival of the Spanish, this does cast suspicion on the authenticity of these tablets. (Note: For example, Métraux said of tablet V in 1938, "its authenticity is doubtful. The signs appear to have been incised with a steel implement, and do not show the regularity and beauty of outline which characterise the original tablets." Imitation tablets were made for the tourist trade as early as the 1880s.)

=== Glyphs ===
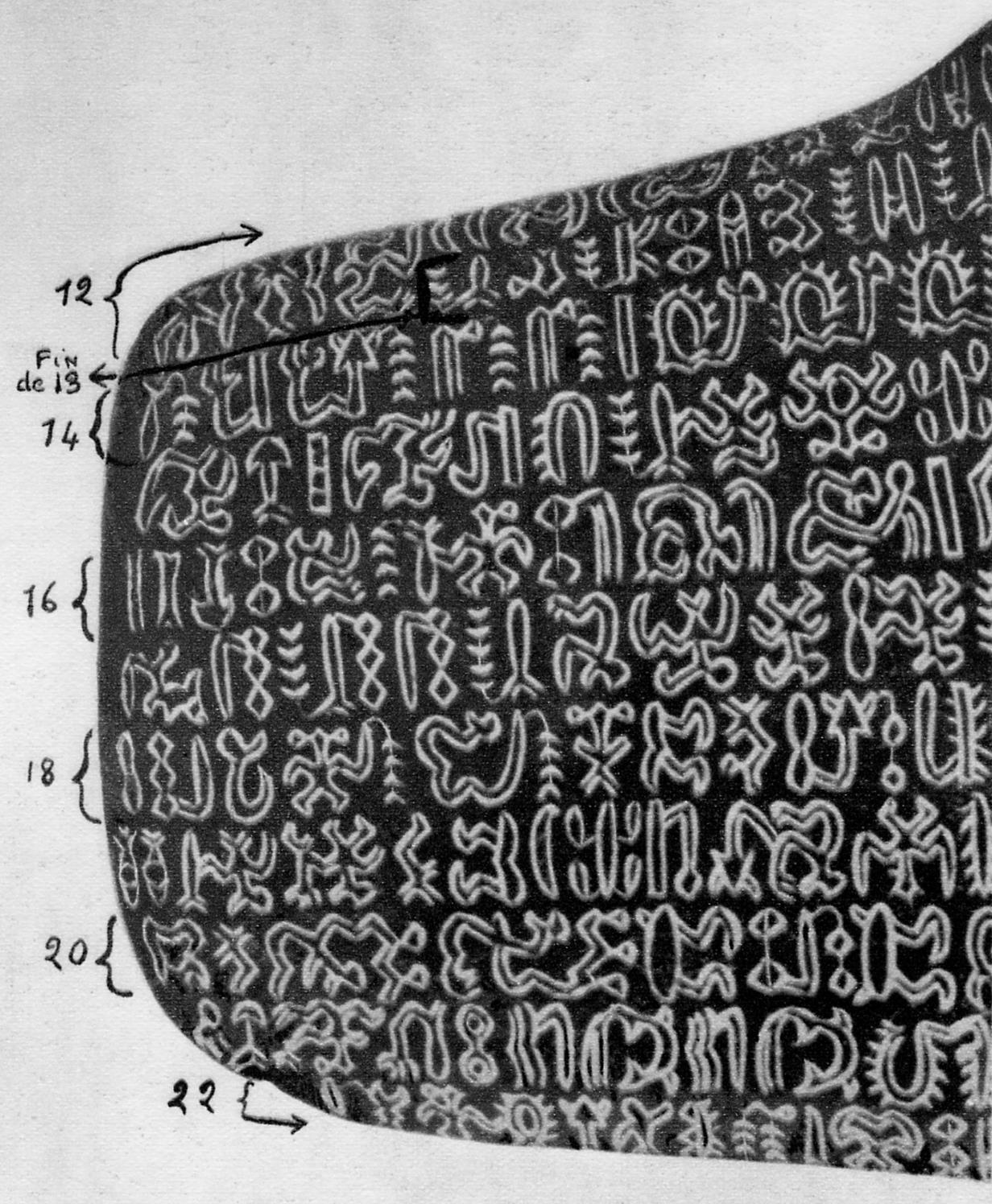
A photographic negative of one end of tablet B. The numbers are line numbers; Fin de 13 means "end of [line] 13".

The glyphs are stylized human, animal, vegetable and geometric shapes, and often form compounds. Nearly all those with heads are oriented head up and are either seen face on or in profile to the right, in the direction of writing. It is not known what significance turning a glyph head-down or to the left may have had. Heads often have characteristic projections on the sides which may be eyes (as on the sea turtle glyph below, and more clearly on sea-turtle petroglyphs) but which often resemble ears (as on the anthropomorphic petroglyph in the next section). Birds are common; many resemble the frigatebird (see image directly below) which was associated with the supreme god Makemake. (Note: However, a glyph resembling a chicken or rooster is not found, despite chickens being the mainstay of the economy and some of the tablets supposedly commemorating "how many men [a chief] had killed, how many chickens he had stolen".) Other glyphs look like fish or arthropods. A few are similar to petroglyphs found throughout the island.

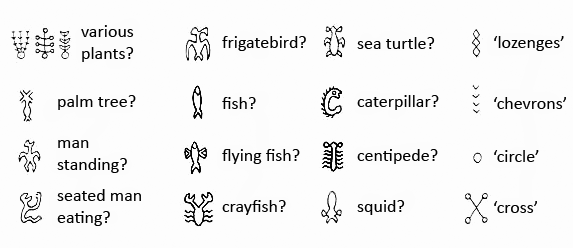
Some of the more iconic rongorongo glyphs. The seated man [bottom left] is thought to be a compound. Readings from Barthel (1958). The captions in the right-most column are merely descriptive.

== Origin ==
Oral tradition holds that either Hotu Matuꞌa or Tuꞌu ko Iho, the legendary founder(s) of Rapa Nui, brought 67 tablets from their homeland. The same founder is also credited with bringing indigenous plants such as the toromiro. But no homeland is likely to have had a tradition of writing in Polynesia or even in South America. Thus rongorongo appears to have been an internal development. Given that few if any of the Rapanui people remaining on the island in the 1870s could read the glyphs, it is likely that only a small minority were ever literate. Indeed, early visitors were told that literacy was a privilege of the ruling families and priests, who were all kidnapped in the Peruvian slaving raids or died soon afterward in the resulting epidemics.

=== Dating the tablets ===
Little direct dating has been done. The start of forest-clearing for agriculture on Easter Island, and thus presumably the first settlements on the island, has been dated to circa 1200, implying a date for the invention of rongorongo no earlier than the 13th century. Tablet Q (Small Saint Petersburg) is the sole item that has been carbon dated, but the results only constrain the date to sometime after 1680. (Note: "The conventional radiocarbon age obtained [...] is 80 ±40 BP and the 2-sigma calibration age (95% probability) is Cal AD 1680 to Cal AD 1740 (Cal BP 270 to 200) and Cal AD 1800 to 1930 (Cal BP 150 to 20) and AD 1950 to 1960 (Cal BP 0 to 0); in fact, this rongorongo was collected in 1871 [so the later date cannot be correct].") Glyph 67 is thought to represent the extinct Easter Island palm, (Note: Following the Jaussen list, which identified it as the niu coconut palm, a species not introduced until after European contact.) which disappeared from the island's pollen record circa 1650, suggesting that the script itself is at least that old.

Texts A, P, and V can be dated to the 18th or 19th century by virtue of being inscribed on European oars. Orliac (2005) argues that the wood for tablet C (Mamari) was cut from the trunk of a tree some 15 meters (50 ft) tall, (Note: Mamari is 19.6 cm (7 1/2 in) wide and includes sapwood along its edges; a trunk of that diameter corresponds to Pacific rosewood's maximum height of 15 m.) and Easter Island has long been deforested of trees that size. Analysis of charcoal indicates that the forest disappeared in the first half of the 17th century. Jakob Roggeveen, who discovered Easter Island in 1722, described the island as "destitute of large trees" and in 1770 Felipe González de Ahedo wrote, "Not a single tree is to be found capable of furnishing a plank so much as six inches [15 cm] in width." Forster, with James Cook's expedition of 1774, reported that "there was not a tree upon the island which exceeded the height of 10 feet [3 m]."

All of these methods date the wood, not the inscriptions themselves. Pacific rosewood is not durable, and is unlikely to survive long in Easter Island's climate.

The tablets preserved in Rome were carbon-dated in a study published February 2, 2024 in Nature. Most dated to the 19th century. One was securely dated to the mid-15th century, suggesting that rongorongo may have been in use well before European contact. It was noted the dating was of the wooden tablet, not of the writing upon it, which could be younger.

=== 1770 Spanish expedition ===
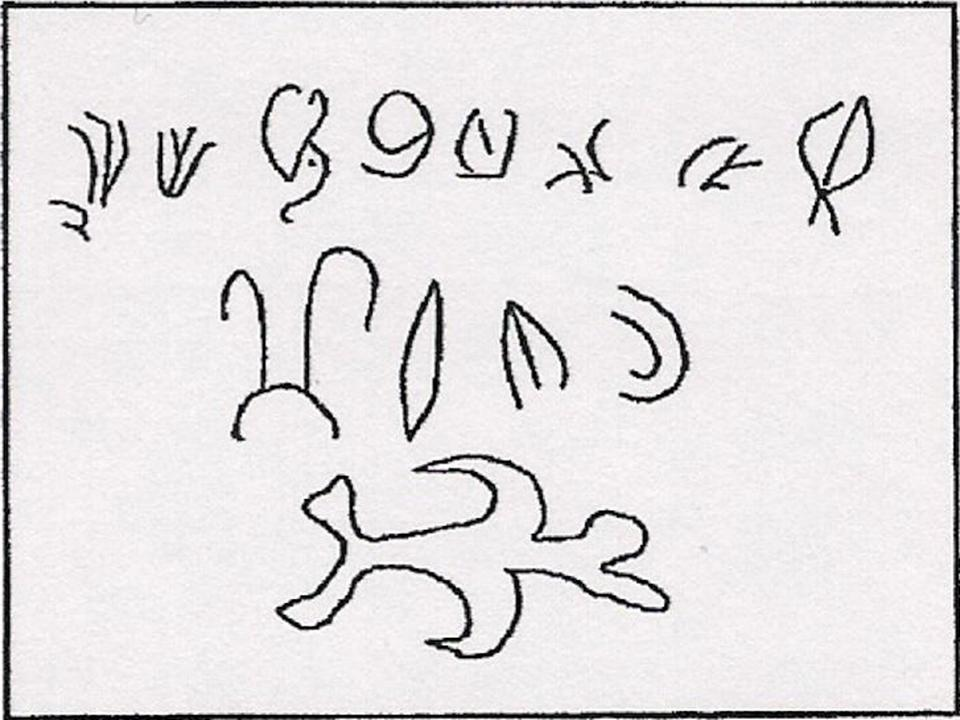
The native signatures on the 1770 Spanish treaty. (Note: These were traced from the original, which has since been lost, and so may not retain their original orientations. They were published with the long line vertical on the left, and the large glyph upright on the right.) The bottommost resembles a rongorongo glyph also used as a petroglyph, 400, or perhaps 300.

In 1770, the Spanish annexed Easter Island under Captain González de Ahedo. A signing ceremony was held in which a treaty of annexation was signed by an undisclosed number of chiefs "by marking upon it certain characters in their own form of script" (reproduction at right).

Several scholars have suggested that rongorongo may be an invention inspired by this visit and the signing of the treaty of annexation. As circumstantial evidence, they note that no explorer reported the script until Eugène Eyraud in 1864, (Note: This interprets the 1770 reports as not meaning that the Spaniards had seen Easter Island writing prior to the signing of the treaty, but had simply presumed that they would have had writing: González de Ahedo had given instructions to "procure the attestations of the recognised Chiefs or Caciques of the islanders, signed in their native characters".) and that the marks with which the chiefs signed the Spanish treaty do not resemble rongorongo. These researchers' hypothesis is not that rongorongo was itself a copy of the Latin alphabet, or of any other form of writing, but that the concept of writing had been conveyed in a process anthropologists term trans-cultural diffusion, which then inspired the islanders to invent their own writing system. If so, rongorongo emerged, flourished, fell into oblivion, and was all but forgotten within a span of less than 100 years.

Known cases of the diffusion of writing, such as Sequoyah's invention of the Cherokee syllabary after observing English-language newspapers, or Uyaquk's invention of the Yugtun script after being inspired by readings from Christian scripture, involved greater contact than the signing of a single treaty. The glyphs could be crudely written rongorongo, as might be expected for Rapa Nui representatives writing with the novel instrument of pen on paper. That the script was not otherwise observed by early explorers, who spent little time on the island, may reflect that it was taboo; such taboos may have lost power along with the tangata rongorongo (scribes) by the time Rapa Nui society collapsed following Peruvian slaving raids and the resulting epidemics, so that the tablets had become more widely distributed by Eyraud's day. Orliac points out that Tablet C appears to predate the Spanish visit by at least a century.

=== Petroglyphs ===
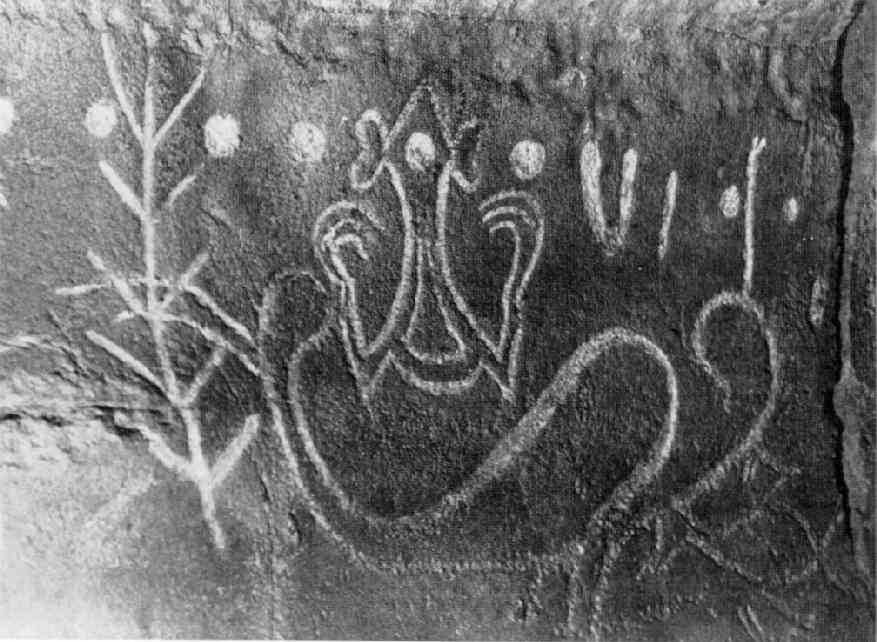
Petroglyphs in the cave Ana o Keke resemble the feather-like rongorongo glyph 3 (left) and a compound glyph 211:42 (center), a hapax legomenon found in Br1, followed by a V shape that may be glyph 27 . A line of divots passes through them.

Easter Island has the richest assortment of petroglyphs in Polynesia. Nearly every suitable surface has been carved, including the stone walls of some houses and a few of the famous moꞌai statues and their fallen topknots. Around 1,000 sites with over 4,000 glyphs have been catalogued, some in bas- or sunken-relief, and some painted red and white. Designs include a concentration of chimeric bird-man figures at Orongo, a ceremonial center of the tangata manu ("bird-man") cult; faces of the creation deity Makemake; marine animals like turtles, tuna, swordfish, sharks, whales, dolphins, crabs, and octopuses (some with human faces); roosters; canoes, and over 500 komari (vulvas). Petroglyphs are often accompanied by carved divots ("cupules") in the rock. Changing traditions are preserved in bas-relief birdmen, which were carved over simpler outline forms and in turn carved over with komari. Although the petroglyphs cannot be directly dated, some are partially obscured by pre-colonial stone buildings, suggesting they are relatively old.

Several of the anthropomorphic and animal-form petroglyphs have parallels in rongorongo, for instance a double-headed frigatebird (glyph 680) on a fallen moꞌai topknot, a figure which also appears on a dozen tablets. (Note: See image. Other examples of petroglyphs which resemble rongorongo glyphs can be seen here and here.) McLaughlin (2004) illustrates the most prominent correspondences with the petroglyph corpus of Georgia Lee (1992). But these are mostly isolated glyphs; few text-like sequences or ligatures have been found among the petroglyphs. This has led to the suggestion that rongorongo must be a recent creation, perhaps inspired by petroglyph designs or retaining individual petroglyphs as logograms (Macri 1995), but not old enough to have been incorporated into the petroglyphic tradition. The most complex candidate for petroglyphic rongorongo is what appears to be a short sequence of glyphs, one a ligature, carved on a cave wall. But the sequence does not appear to have been carved in a single hand (see image at right), and the cave is near the house that produced the Poike tablet, a crude imitation of rongorongo, so the Ana o Keke petroglyphs may not be authentic.

== Historical record ==
=== Discovery ===
Eugène Eyraud, a lay friar of the Congrégation de Picpus, landed on Easter Island on January 2, 1864, on the 24th day of his departure from Valparaíso. He was to remain on Easter Island for nine months, evangelizing its inhabitants. He wrote an account of his stay in which he reports his discovery of the tablets that year:

In every hut one finds wooden tablets or sticks covered in several sorts of hieroglyphic characters: They are depictions of animals unknown on the island, which the natives draw with sharp stones. Each figure has its own name; but the scant attention they pay to these tablets leads me to think that these characters, remnants of some primitive writing, are now for them a habitual practice which they keep without seeking its meaning. (Note: Dans toutes les cases on trouve des tablettes de bois ou des bâtons couverts de plusieurs espèces de caractères hiéroglyphiques: ce sont des figures d'animaux inconnues dans l'île, que les indigènes tracent au moyen de pierres tranchantes. Chaque figure a son nom; mais le peu de cas qu'ils font de ces tablettes m'incline à penser que ces caractères, restes d'une écriture primitive, sont pour eux maintenant un usage qu'ils conservent sans en chercher le sens.)

— Eyraud 1866:71

There is no other mention of the tablets in his report, and the discovery went unnoticed. Eyraud left Easter Island on October 11, 1864, in extremely poor health. Ordained a priest in 1865, he returned to Easter Island in 1866 where he died of tuberculosis in August 1868, aged 48.

=== Destruction ===
In 1868, the Bishop of Tahiti, Florentin-Étienne "Tepano" Jaussen, received a gift from the recent Catholic converts of Easter Island. It was a long cord of human hair, a fishing line perhaps, wound around a small wooden board covered in hieroglyphic writing. Stunned at the discovery, he wrote to Father Hippolyte Roussel on Easter Island to collect all the tablets and to find natives capable of translating them. But Roussel could only recover a few, and the islanders could not agree on how to read them.

However, Eyraud had seen hundreds of tablets only four years earlier. What happened to the missing tablets is a matter of conjecture. Eyraud had noted how little interest their owners had in them. Stéphen Chauvet reports that:

The Bishop questioned the Rapanui wise man, Ouroupano Hinapote, the son of the wise man Tekaki [who said that] he, himself, had begun the requisite studies and knew how to carve the characters with a small shark's tooth. He said that there was nobody left on the island who knew how to read the characters since the Peruvians had brought about the deaths of all the wise men and, thus, the pieces of wood were no longer of any interest to the natives who burned them as firewood or wound their fishing lines around them! A. Pinart also saw some in 1877. [He] was not able to acquire these tablets because the natives were using them as reels for their fishing lines!

— Chauvet 1935:381–382

Orliac has observed that the deep black indentation, about 10 centimeters (3.9 in) long, on lines 5 and 6 of the recto of tablet H is a groove made by the rubbing of a fire stick, showing that tablet H had been used for fire-making. Tablets S and P had been cut into lashed planking for a canoe, which fits the story of a man named Niari who made a canoe out of abandoned tablets.

As European-introduced diseases and raids by Peruvian slavers, including a final devastating raid in 1862 and a subsequent smallpox epidemic, had reduced the Rapa Nui population to under two hundred by the 1870s, it is possible that literacy had been wiped out by the time Eyraud discovered the tablets in 1864. (Note: Métraux (1940) reports that, "The present population of 456 natives is entirely derived from the 111 natives left after the abandonment of the island by the French missionaries in 1872." However, Routledge (1919) gives a figure of 171 left after an evacuation led by Father Roussel in 1871, mostly old men, and Cooke (1899) states that the evacuation of some 300 islanders was in 1878, that "When H. M. S. Sappho touched at the island in 1882 it was reported that but 150 of the inhabitants were left", and goes on to give a summary of a complete census he received from Salmon in 1886 which listed 155 natives and 11 foreigners.)

Thus, in 1868, Jaussen could recover only a few tablets, with three more acquired by Captain Gana of the Chilean corvette O'Higgins in 1870. In the 1950s, Barthel found the decayed remains of half a dozen tablets in caves, in the context of burials. However, no glyphs could be salvaged. (Note: Fischer translates Barthel, concerning four of these tablets: "To judge by the form, size, and type of keeping one can say with a high degree of certainty that this involved tablets that were presented at two interments.")

Of the 26 commonly accepted texts that survive, only half are in good condition and authentic beyond doubt.

=== Anthropological accounts ===
British archaeologist and anthropologist Katherine Routledge undertook a 1914–1915 scientific expedition to Rapa Nui with her husband to catalog the art, customs, and writing of the island. She was able to interview two elderly informants, Kapiera and a leper named Tomenika, who allegedly had some knowledge of rongorongo. The sessions were not very fruitful, as the two often contradicted each other. From them Routledge concluded that rongorongo was an idiosyncratic mnemonic device that did not directly represent language, in other words, proto-writing, and that the meanings of the glyphs were reformulated by each scribe, so that the kōhau rongorongo could not be read by someone not trained in that specific text. The texts themselves she believed to be litanies for priest-scribes, kept apart in special houses and strictly tapu, that recorded the island's history and mythology. (Note: However, Pozdniakov & Pozdniakov (2007) believe that the limited and repetitive nature of the texts precludes them recording anything as diverse as history or mythology.) By the time of later ethnographic accounts, such as Métraux (1940), much of what Routledge recorded in her notes had been forgotten, and the oral history showed a strong external influence from popular published accounts.

== Corpus ==
The 26 rongorongo texts with letter codes are inscribed on wooden objects, each with between 2 and 2320 simple glyphs and components of compound glyphs, for over 15,000 in all. The objects are mostly oblong wooden tablets, with the exceptions of I, a possibly sacred chieftain's staff known as the Santiago Staff; J and L, inscribed on reimiro pectoral ornaments worn by the elite; X, inscribed on various parts of a tangata manu statuette; and Y, a European snuff box assembled from sections cut from a rongorongo tablet. The tablets, like the pectorals, statuettes, and staves, were works of art and valued possessions, and were apparently given individual proper names in the same manner as jade ornaments in New Zealand. Two of the tablets, C and S, have a documented pre-missionary provenance, though others may be as old or older. There are in addition a few isolated glyphs or short sequences which might prove to be rongorongo.

=== Classic texts ===
Barthel referred to each of 24 texts he accepted as genuine with a letter of the alphabet; two texts have been added to the corpus since then. The two faces of the tablets are distinguished by suffixing r (recto) or v (verso) when the reading sequence can be ascertained, to which the line being discussed is appended. Thus Pr2 is item P (the Great Saint Petersburg Tablet), recto, second line. When the reading sequence cannot be ascertained, a and b are used for the faces. Thus Ab1 is item A (Tahua), side b, first line. The six sides of the Snuff Box are lettered as sides a to f. Nearly all publications follow the Barthel convention, though a popular book by Fischer uses an idiosyncratic numbering system.

Rongorongo text corpus
Barthel code	Fischer code	Nickname / Description	Location	Notes
A	RR1	Tahua (the Oar)	Rome	1825 glyphs inscribed on a 91-centimetre (36 in) European or American oar blade. Ash wood.
B	RR4	Aruku kurenga	Rome	1135 glyphs on a 41-centimetre (16 in) fluted rosewood tablet.
C	RR2	Mamari	Rome	1000 glyphs on a 29-centimetre (11 in) unfluted rosewood tablet. Contains calendrical information; more pictographic than other texts.
D	RR3	Échancrée	Pape'ete	270 glyphs on a 30-centimetre (12 in) unfluted notched tablet. The tablet first given to Jaussen, as a spool for a cord of hair. The two sides are written in different hands. Yellowwood?
E	RR6	Keiti	(Leuven)	822 glyphs on a 39-centimetre (15 in) fluted tablet. Destroyed by fire in World War I.
F	RR7	Chauvet fragment	New York (Note: In the collection of the Merton D. Simpson Gallery.)	A 12-centimetre (4.7 in) fragment with 51 recorded crudely executed glyphs. (Some glyphs are covered by a label.) Palm wood?
G	RR8	Small Santiago	Santiago	720 glyphs on a 32-centimetre (13 in) fluted rosewood tablet. The verso may include a genealogy and does not resemble the patterns of other texts.
H	RR9	Large Santiago	Santiago	1580 glyphs on a 44-centimetre (17 in) fluted rosewood tablet. Nearly duplicates P and Q.
I	RR10	Santiago staff	Santiago	2920 glyphs inscribed on a 126-centimetre (50 in) chief's staff. The longest text, and the only one which appears to have punctuation. Among the patterns of the other texts, it resembles only Gv and Ta.
J	RR20	Large reimiro	London	A 73-centimetre (29 in) breast ornament decorated with two glyphs. May be old.
K	RR19	London	London	163 crudely executed glyphs paraphrasing Gr on a 22-centimetre (8.7 in) rosewood tablet.
L	RR21	Small reimiro	London	A 41-centimetre (16 in) breast ornament decorated with a line of 44 glyphs. May be old. Rosewood.
M	RR24	Large Vienna	Vienna	A 28-centimetre (11 in) rosewood tablet in poor condition. Side b is destroyed; 54 glyphs are visible on side a. An early cast preserves more of the text.
N	RR23	Small Vienna	Vienna	172 intricately carved glyphs, loosely paraphrasing Ev, on a 26-centimetre (10 in) piece of yellowwood.
O	RR22	Berlin	Berlin	103-centimetre (41 in) piece of fluted driftwood with 90 legible glyphs on side a. In poor condition, none of the glyphs on side b can be identified.
P	RR18	Large St Petersburg	St. Petersburg	1163 glyphs inscribed on a 63-centimetre (25 in) European or American oar blade. Yellowwood. Had been used for planking. Nearly duplicates H and Q.
Q	RR17	Small St Petersburg	St. Petersburg	718 glyphs on a 44-centimetre (17 in) fluted rosewood tree trunk. Nearly duplicates H and P. A closeup of Qr3–7 is shown in the infobox.
R	RR15	Small Washington	Washington	357 glyphs, nearly all in phrases repeated on other texts, on a 24-centimetre (9.4 in) piece.
S	RR16	Large Washington	Washington	600 legible glyphs on a 63-centimetre (25 in) piece of yellowwood. Later cut for planking.
T	RR11	Fluted Honolulu	Honolulu	120 legible glyphs on a 31-centimetre (12 in) fluted tablet. In poor condition, side b is illegible.
U	RR12	Honolulu beam	Honolulu	27 legible glyphs on a 70-centimetre (28 in) European or American beam. In poor condition. The two sides are written in different hands.
V	RR13	Honolulu oar	Honolulu	22 legible glyphs on a 72-centimetre (28 in) European or American oar blade. In poor condition. One line of text, plus a separate pair of glyphs, on side a; traces of text on side b.
W	RR14	Honolulu fragment	Honolulu	A 7-centimetre (2.8 in) fragment with 8 glyphs on the one side that has been described.
X	RR25	Tangata manu (New York birdman)	New York	A 33-centimetre (13 in) birdman statuette with 37 superficially inscribed glyphs separated in seven short scattered texts.
Y	RR5	Paris snuffbox	Paris	A 7-centimetre (2.8 in) box cut and pieced together from three planed pieces of a tablet; 85 crude glyphs on outside of box only. Driftwood?
Z	T4	Poike palimpsest	Santiago	Driftwood? 11 centimetres (4.3 in). Apparently a palimpsest; Fischer does not consider the legible layer of text to be genuine.
n/a	n/a	Ragitoki	Undisclosed	Barkcloth, possibly illegitimate

Crude glyphs have been found on a few stone objects and some additional wooden items, but most of these are thought to be fakes created for the early tourism market. Several of the 26 wooden texts are suspect due to uncertain provenance (X, Y, and Z), poor quality craftsmanship (F, K, V, W, Y, and Z), or to having been carved with a steel blade (K, V, and Y), and thus, although they may prove to be genuine, should not be trusted in initial attempts at decipherment. Z resembles many early forgeries in not being boustrophedon, but it may be a palimpsest on an authentic but now illegible text.

==== Ragitoki ====
The Raŋitoki fragment (Ragitoki, Rangitoki) is a possible rongorongo text, though its authenticity has been called into question. According to rapanui historian Moreno Pakarati's blog, the fragment is a forgery:

An anonymous owner of the piece allowed the authors to photograph and study it and gave them a fanciful tale about an ancestor named Albrecht van Houten, who supposedly traveled to Rapa Nui in March of 1869. A local woman named "Raƞitoki" allegedly provided him with the object. However, Catholic missionaries who were present on Rapa Nui at that time and wrote several dozens of letters kept a record of every ship that called on the island. There is no vessel that called in Hanga Roa, and no mention of any Albrecht van Houten in March of 1869. Raƞitoki is not a female Rapanui name recorded anywhere in the abundant genealogical, baptismal or burial records from before 1871. The piece looks exactly like typical painted barkcloth souvenirs sold to tourists between 2010 and 2020.

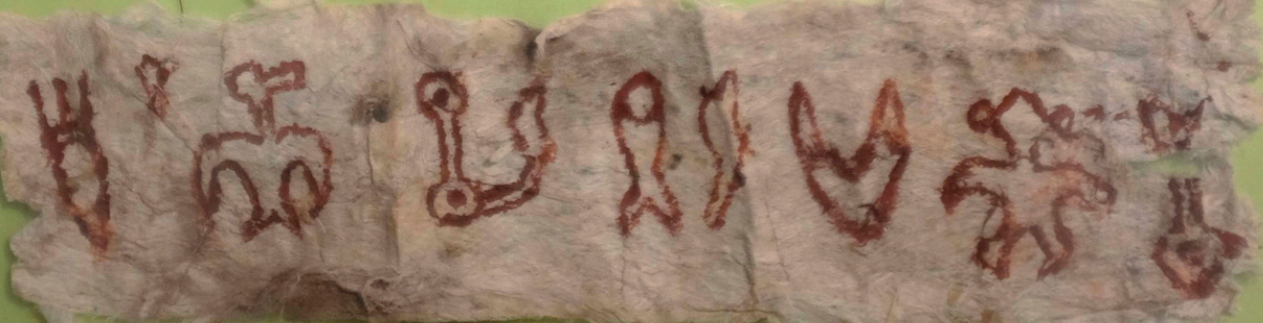

Van Houten had observed that Rapa Nui women wore loincloths adorned with "symbols". Van Houten rolled the fragment into a "scroll", tied it with a piece of twine, and placed it in a pocket-watch case along with a pair of skull-bone beads and a note that has been read,

Ein Stück von dem Rock meiner geliebten wunderschöner Rangitoki. An mich als Geschenk überreicht – März, 1869 –
(A piece from the skirt of my beloved precious Rangitoki. Given to me as a present – March, 1869 –)

(The word here deciphered as überreicht 'offered/given' is unclear.)

The watchcase was handed down in Van Houten's family in Switzerland until it was put up for auction in 2018. Only when it was evaluated were the symbols on the cloth identified as rongorongo.

It consists of red ink on undyed (or at least faded) barkcloth, 4.5 × 15.5 cm. The nine glyphs were apparently painted on the cloth with some kind of brush. The piece is reportedly a strip torn from a skirt/loincloth. Bark-cloth cloaks and headpieces were indications of high status in the pre-missionary period. Inks used on bark cloth – made from roots, berries and minerals – were apparently rather sophisticated. The cloth was made from the paper mulberry tree, which was formerly prevalent on Easter Island. It is possible that such items were recycled into more mundane clothing after the arrival of missionaries in 1864, and that the glyphs therefore date to a period when the elite were literate in rongorongo.

The identification of the nine glyphs is not entirely secure. An argument for the authenticity of the text is that the glyphs do not appear to be copies from known texts. The glyphs, from left to right, have been tentatively identified as,

50 95h [hoch 'raised'] 600 46.76 700 V76 26V 200 95x

=== Additional texts ===
In addition to the petroglyphs mentioned above, there are a few other very short uncatalogued texts that may be rongorongo. Fischer reports that "many statuettes reveal rongorongo or rongorongo-like glyphs on their crown." He gives the example of a compound glyph,, on the crown of a moꞌai pakapaka statuette. (Note: Or perhaps moꞌai paꞌapaꞌa. Catalog # 402-1, labeled моаи папа, in the St Petersburg museum. Although this compound of glyph 02 inside 70 is not otherwise attested, linked sequences of 70.02 are found, for example in Ab6, and it is formally analogous to other infixed compounds of glyph 70.) Many human skulls are inscribed with the single 'fish' glyph 700, which may stand for ika "war casualty; fish". There are other designs, including some tattoos recorded by early visitors, which are possibly single rongorongo glyphs, but since they are isolated and pictographic, it is difficult to know whether or not they are actually writing. In 2018, a possibly authentic ink-on-barkcloth sequence dating from 1869, dubbed the "Raŋitoki fragment", was recognized.

=== Glyphs ===
The only published reference to the glyphs which is even close to comprehensive remains Barthel (1958). Barthel assigned a three-digit numeric code to each glyph or to each group of similar-looking glyphs that he believed to be allographs (variants). In the case of allography, the bare numeric code was assigned to what Barthel believed to be the basic form (Grundtypus), while variants were specified by alphabetic suffixes. Altogether he assigned 600 numeric codes. The hundreds place is a digit from 0 to 7, and categorizes the head, or overall form if there is no head: 0 and 1 for geometric shapes and inanimate objects; 2 for figures with "ears"; 3 and 4 for figures with open mouths (they are differentiated by their legs/tails); 5 for figures with miscellaneous heads; 6 for figures with beaks; and 7 for fish, arthropods, etc. The digits in tens and units places were allocated similarly, so that, for example, glyphs 206, 306, 406, 506, and 606 all have a downward-pointing wing or arm on the left, and a raised four-fingered hand on the right:

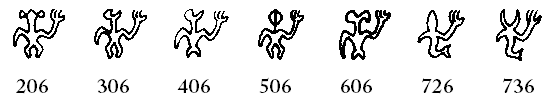
Coding: The first digit distinguishes head and basic body shape, and the six in the units place indicates a specific raised hand.

There is some arbitrariness to which glyphs are grouped together, and there are inconsistencies in the assignments of numerical codes and the use of affixes which make the system rather complex. However, despite its shortcomings, Barthel's is the only effective system ever proposed to categorize rongorongo glyphs.

Barthel (1971) claimed to have parsed the corpus of glyphs to 120, of which the other 480 in his inventory are allographs or ligatures. (Note: 55 glyphs would be required for a pure syllabary, assuming that long vowels were ignored or treated as vowel sequences.) The evidence was never published, but similar counts have been obtained by other scholars, such as Pozdniakov & Pozdniakov (2007).

=== Published corpus ===
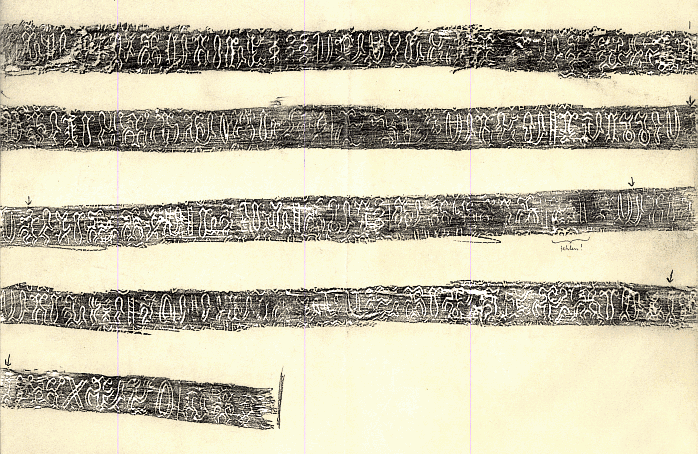
Rubbing of the first line of the Santiago Staff, used by Barthel (CEIPP archives)

For almost a century only a few of the texts were published. In 1875, the director of the Chilean National Museum of Natural History in Santiago, Rudolf Philippi, published the Santiago Staff, and Carroll (1892) published part of the Oar. Most texts remained beyond the reach of would-be decipherers until 1958, when Thomas Barthel published line drawings of almost all the known corpus in his Grundlagen zur Entzifferung der Osterinselschrift ("Bases for the Decipherment of the Easter Island script") which remains the fundamental reference to rongorongo. He transcribed texts A through X, over 99% of the corpus; the CEIPP estimates that it is 97% accurate. Barthel's line drawings were not produced free-hand but copied from rubbings, which helped ensure their faithfulness to the originals.

Fischer (1997) published new line drawings. These include lines scored with obsidian but not finished with a shark tooth, which had not been recorded by Barthel because the rubbings he used often did not show them, for example on tablet N. (However, in line Gv4 shown in the section on writing instruments above, the light lines were recorded by both Fischer and Barthel.) There are other omissions in Barthel which Fischer corrects, such as a sequence of glyphs at the transition from line Ca6 to Ca7 which is missing from Barthel, presumably because the carving went over the side of the tablet and was missed by Barthel's rubbing. (This missing sequence is right in the middle of Barthel's calendar.) However, other discrepancies between the two records are straightforward contradictions. For instance, the initial glyph of I12 (line 12 of the Santiago Staff) in Fischer does not correspond with that of Barthel or Philippi, which agree with each other, and Barthel's rubbing (below) is incompatible with Fischer's drawing. Barthel's annotation, Original doch 53.76! ("original indeed 53.76!"), suggests that he specifically verified Philippi's reading:

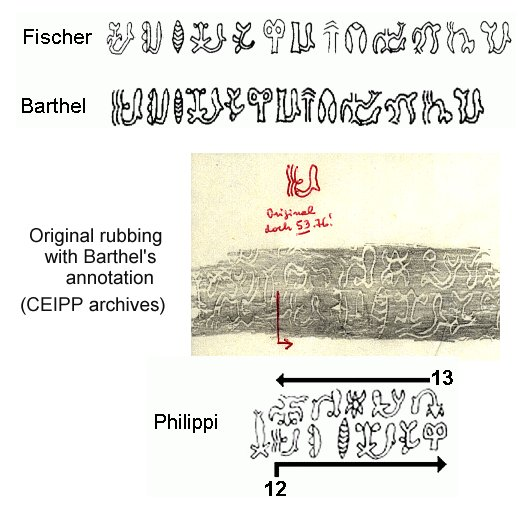
A comparison of line 12 of rongorongo text I as traced by Fischer, Barthel, and Philippi, plus Barthel's annotated pencil rubbing of the same line.

In addition, the next glyph (glyph 20, a "spindle with three knobs") is missing its right-side "sprout" (glyph 10) in Philippi's drawing. This may be the result of an error in the inking, since there is a blank space in its place. The corpus is thus tainted with quite some uncertainty. It has never been properly checked for want of high-quality photographs.

== Decipherment ==
As with most undeciphered scripts, there are many fanciful interpretations and claimed translations of rongorongo. However, apart from a portion of one tablet which has been shown to have to do with a lunar Rapa Nui calendar and a possible genealogy, none of the texts are understood. There are three serious obstacles to decipherment, assuming rongorongo is truly writing: the small number of remaining texts, the lack of context such as illustrations in which to interpret them, and the poor attestation of the Old Rapa Nui language, since modern Rapa Nui is heavily mixed with Tahitian and is therefore unlikely to closely reflect the language of the tablets.

The prevailing opinion is that rongorongo is not true writing but proto-writing, or even a more limited mnemonic device for genealogy, choreography, navigation, astronomy, or agriculture. For example, the Atlas of Languages states, "It was probably used as a memory aid or for decorative purposes, not for recording the Rapanui language of the islanders." If this is the case, then there is little hope of ever deciphering it. (Note: Other examples of protowriting, such as the Dongba script of China, have proved impossible to read without help. However, the original conclusion that rongorongo did not encode language may have been based on spurious statistics. See decipherment of rongorongo for details.) For those who believe it to be writing, there is debate as to whether rongorongo is essentially logographic or syllabic, though it appears to be compatible with neither a pure logography nor a pure syllabary.

Inventory of possible rongorongo characters (Note: This basic inventory of rongorongo, proposed by Pozdniakov & Pozdniakov (2007), accounts for 99.7% of the intact texts, except for the idiosyncratic Staff.)
Glyph 001	Glyph 002	Glyph 003	Glyph 004	Glyph 005	Glyph 006	Glyph 007	Glyph 008	Glyph 009	Glyph 010	Glyph 014	Glyph 015	Glyph 016
01	02	03	04	05	06	07	08	09	10	14	15	16
Glyph 022	Glyph 025	Glyph 027	Glyph 028	Glyph 034	Glyph 038	Glyph 041	Glyph 044	Glyph 046	Glyph 047	Glyph 050	Glyph 052	Glyph 053
22	25	27AB	28	34	38	41	44	46	47	50	52	53
Glyph 059	Glyph 060	Glyph 061	Glyph 062	Glyph 063	Glyph 066	Glyph 067	Glyph 069	Glyph 070	Glyph 071	Glyph 074	Glyph 076	Glyph 091
59	60	61	62	63	66	67	69	70	71	74	76	91
Glyph 095	Glyph 099	Glyph 200	Glyph 240	Glyph 280	Glyph 380	Glyph 400	Glyph 530	Glyph 660	Glyph 700	Glyph 720	Glyph 730	Glyph 901
95	99	200	240	280	380	400	530	660	700	720	730	901

== Computer encoding ==
The Unicode Consortium had at one time tentatively allocated range 1CA80–1CDBF of the Supplementary Multilingual Plane for encoding the rongorongo script, but this tentative allocation has since been withdrawn. An encoding proposal has been written by Michael Everson.

== Bibliography ==
- Bahn, Paul (1996). "Cracking the Easter Island code". New Scientist. 150 (2034): 36–39.
- Barthel, Thomas S. (1958). Grundlagen zur Entzifferung der Osterinselschrift [Bases for the Decipherment of the Easter Island Script] (in German). Hamburg: Cram, de Gruyter.
- ———— (June 1958). "The 'Talking Boards' of Easter Island". Scientific American. 198 (6): 61–68. Bibcode:1958SciAm.198f..61B. doi:10.1038/scientificamerican0658-61. ISSN 0036-8733.
- ———— (1959). "Neues zur Osterinselschrift" [News on the Easter Island Script]. Zeitschrift für Ethnologie (in German). 84: 161–172.
- ———— (1971). Pre-contact Writing in Oceania. Current Trends in Linguistics. Vol. 8. Mouton. pp. 1165–1186.
- Blust, Robert; Trussel, Stephen (June 21, 2020). "Austronesian Comparative Dictionary, web edition".
- Buck, Peter H. (1938). Vikings of the Pacific. Chicago: University of Chicago Press.
- Carroll, Alan (1892). "The Easter Island inscriptions, and the translation and interpretation of them". Journal of the Polynesian Society. 1: 103–106, 233–252. ISSN 0032-4000.
- Chauvet, Stéphen-Charles (2004) [1935]. McLaughlin, Shawn (ed.). L'île de Pâques et ses mystères [Easter Island and its Mysteries] (in French). Translated by Altman, Ann. Paris: Éditions Tel.
- Comrie, Bernard; Matthews, Stephen; Polinsky, Maria (1996). The Atlas of Languages. London: Quarto.
- Cooke, George H. (1899). "Te Pito te Henua, known as Rapa Nui, commonly called Easter Island". Report of the United States National Museum for 1897. Washington: Government Printing Office. pp. 689–723.
- Corney, Bolton Glanvill, ed. (1903). The voyage of Captain Don Felipe González in the ship of the line San Lorenzo, with the frigate Santa Rosalia in company, to Easter Island in 1770-1. Preceded by an extract from Mynheer Jacob Roggeveen's official log of his discovery of and visit to Easter Island in 1722. Cambridge: Hakluyt Society.
- Dederen, François; Fischer, Steven Roger (1993). "Traditional Production of the Rapanui Tablets". In Fischer (ed.). Easter Island Studies: Contributions to the History of Rapanui in Memory of William T. Mulloy. Oxbow Monograph. Vol. 32. Oxford: Oxbow Books.
- Englert, Sebastian (1970). Mulloy, William (ed.). Island at the Center of the World. Translated by Mulloy, William. New York: Charles Scribner's Sons.
- ———— (1980). Leyendas de Isla de Pascua (textos bilingües) (in Spanish). Santiago: Ediciones de la Universidad de Chile.
- ———— (1993). La tierra de Hotu Matuꞌa – Historia y Etnología de la Isla de Pascua, Gramática y Diccionario del antiguo idioma de la isla [The Land of Hotu Matuꞌa: History and Ethnology of Easter Island, Grammar and Dictionary of the Old Language of the Island)] (in Spanish) (6th ed.). Santiago: Editorial Universitaria.
- ———— (2002). Legends of Easter Island. Translated by LeFort, Ben; Pacheco, Pilar. Easter Island: Father Sebastian Englert Anthropological Museum.
- Eyraud, Eugène (1866). "Lettre du Fr. Eugène Eyraud, au T.R.P. Supérieur général (1864)". Annales de la Propagation de la Foi [Annals of the Propagation of the Faith)] (in French). pp. 36: 52–71, 124–138. Lyon.
- Fischer, Steven Roger (1997). RongoRongo, the Easter Island Script: History, Traditions, Texts. Oxford and New York: Oxford University Press.
- Flenley, John R.; Bahn, Paul G. (1992). Easter Island, Earth Island. London: Thames & Hudson.
- Guy, Jacques B.M. (1998a). "Un prétendu déchiffrement des tablettes de l'île de Pâques" [A purported decipherment of the Easter Island tablets]. Journal de la Société des Océanistes (in French). 106: 57–63. doi:10.3406/jso.1998.2041. ISSN 0300-953X.
- ———— (1998b). "Rongorongo: The Easter Island Tablets". Archived from the original on 2008-05-09.
- ———— (2000). "The Rongorongo of Easter Island: The Hand-Drawn Reproductions". Archived from the original on 2007-01-06.
- Haberlandt, Michael [in German] (1886). "Ueber Schrifttafeln von der Osterinsel" [On the written tablets of Easter Island]. Mitteilungen der Anthropologischen Gesellschaft in Wien (in German). 16: 97–102.
- Horley, Paul (2009). "Rongorongo Script: Carving Techniques and Scribal Corrections". Journal de la Société des Océanistes. 129 (129): 249–261. doi:10.4000/jso.5813. ISSN 0300-953X.
- Lee, Georgia (1992). The Rock Art of Easter Island: Symbols of Power, Prayers to the Gods. Los Angeles: UCLA Institute of Archaeology Publications.
- Macri, Martha J. (1996) [1995]. "RongoRongo of Easter Island". In Daniels and Bright (ed.). The World's Writing Systems. Oxford University Press. pp. 183–188.
- Mann, Daniel; Edward, J.; Chase, J.; Beck, W.; Reanier, R.; Mass, M.; Finney, B.; Loret, J. (2008). "Drought, vegetation change, and human history on Rapa Nui (Isla de Pascua, Easter Island)" (PDF). Quaternary Research. 69 (1). Elsevier B.V.: 16–28. Bibcode:2008QuRes..69...16M. doi:10.1016/j.yqres.2007.10.009. ISSN 0033-5894. S2CID 10915480. Archived from the original on 2009-03-04.
- McDorman, Richard E. (2009). "Universal Iconography in Writing Systems: Evidence and Explanation in the Easter Island and Indus Valley Scripts" (PDF). Archived from the original (PDF) on 2021-02-25.
- Métraux, Alfred (1938). "Two Easter Island Tablets in the Bernice P. Bishop Museum". Man. 38 (1). London: Royal Anthropological Institute: 1–4. doi:10.2307/2789179. ISSN 0025-1496. JSTOR 2789179.
- ———— (1940). "Ethnology of Easter Island". Bernice P. Bishop Museum Bulletin. 160. Honolulu: Bernice P. Bishop Museum Press. LCCN 40029585.
- McLaughlin, Shawn (2004). "Rongorongo and the Rock Art of Easter Island". Rapa Nui Journal. 18: 87–94. hdl:10524/64642.
- Orliac, Catherine (2005a). Manifestation de l'expression symbolique en Océanie : l'exemple des bois d'œuvre de l'Ile de Pâques (Manifestation of symbolic expression in Oceania: The example of the woodworking of Easter Island). Cultes, rites et religions (in French). Vol. V. pp. (6): 48–53. HAL hal-02186656.
- ———— (2005b). "The Rongorongo Tablets from Easter Island: Botanical Identification and ^{14}C Dating". Archaeology in Oceania. 40 (3): 115–119. doi:10.1002/j.1834-4453.2005.tb00597.x. ISSN 0728-4896. Archived from the original on 2006-11-09.
- ———— (2007). "Botanical Identification of the Wood of the Large Kohau Rongorongo Tablet of St Petersburg". Rapa Nui Journal. 21 (1): 7–10. hdl:10524/64741.
- Philippi, Rudolfo A. (1875). "Iconografia de la escritura jeroglífica de los indigenas de la isla de Pascua" [Iconography of the hieroglyphic writing of the natives of Easter Island]. Anales de la Universidad de Chile (in Spanish). 47: 670–683.
- Pozdniakov, Konstantin (1996). "Les Bases du Déchiffrement de l'Écriture de l'Ile de Pâques" [The Bases of Deciphering the Writing of Easter Island] (PDF). Journal de la Société des Océanistes (in French). 103 (2): 289–303. doi:10.3406/jso.1996.1995. ISSN 0300-953X. Archived from the original (PDF) on 2008-06-25.
- Pozdniakov, Konstantin; Pozdniakov, Igor (2007). "Rapanui Writing and the Rapanui Language: Preliminary Results of a Statistical Analysis" (PDF). Forum for Anthropology and Culture. 3: 3–36. HAL hal-01389639. Archived from the original (PDF) on 2008-06-25.
- Routledge, Katherine (1919). The Mystery of Easter Island: The story of an expedition. London and Aylesbury: Hazell, Watson and Viney.
- Robert Schoch & Tomi Melka (2019) The Raŋitoki (Rangitoki) bark-cloth piece: A newly recognized Rongorongo fragment from Easter Island. Asian and African Studies 28:2.
- Skjølsvold, Arne (1994). Skjølsvold, Arne (ed.). Archaeological Investigations at Anakena, Easter Island. The Kon Tiki Museum Occasional Papers. Vol. 3. Oslo: Kon-Tiki Museum. pp. 5–120.
