= Rongorongo text N =

One of the undeciphered texts of Easter Island

Text N of the rongorongo corpus, the smaller of two tablets in Vienna and therefore also known as the Small Vienna tablet, is one of two dozen surviving rongorongo texts. It repeats much of the verso of tablet E.

== Other names ==
N is the standard designation, from Barthel (1958). Fischer (1997) refers to it as RR23.

== Location ==
Museum für Völkerkunde, Vienna. Catalog # 22870.

There is a reproduction in the Musée de l'Homme, Paris.

== Description ==
Small Vienna is a rectangular piece of Podocarpus latifolius wood (Orliac 2007), 25.5 × 5.2 × 2 cm, slightly convex but not fluted. It is heavily fire damaged, with one end splintered off, and badly cracked. The surface is corroded, but the glyphs are still legible.

Haberlandt (1886) noticed that N was carved with a different technique than the other tablets. In Fischer's words,

It appears that the glyphs were incised with a sharpened bone instead of a shark's tooth. This is principally evidenced by the shallowness and width of the contour grooves. It also displays secondary working with obsidian flakes to elaborate details within the finished contour lines. No other rongorongo inscription reveals such graphic extravagance.

== Provenance ==
In 1882 an archaeological expedition aboard the SMS Hyäne visited Easter Island, and Captain Wilhelm Geiseler purchased two tablets. The purchase had been arranged by Schlubach, the German consul in Valparaíso, at the request of Adolf Bastian, the director of the Ethnological Museum of Berlin. The tablets were given to the uncle of Schlubach's wife, Alexander Salmon, Jr, who then shipped three tablets, M, N, and O, to Schlubach. Several years later, when Schlubach returned to Hamburg, he sent just one of the tablets to Bastian and sold the other two privately to the Hamburg firm "Klée und Kocher". They were then sold to the Austrian Vice-Consul in Hamburg, Heinrich Freiherr von Westenholz, who donated them to Vienna's Museum für Völkerkunde in 1886.

Alexander Salmon, Jr, the manager of the Brander plantations on Easter Island who had transcribed and (poorly) translated the 'readings' that Jaussen obtained for his texts, encouraged the manufacture of Rapanui artworks, and several scholars, notably Métraux, believe the small Vienna tablet to be a forgery. However, Salmon never presented them as authentic, and Fischer (1997) accepts this text as genuine, noting the 'extravagance' of its carving.

== Contents ==
Pozdniakov (1996) believes the entire text of the Small Vienna tablet is contained within the verso of E. Side b also shares a long sequence with tablet H and shorter sequences with tablets B and P. Most of side a appears to be a list of sequences introduced by 380.1+52, similar to the repeated 380.1 or 380.1+3 found on half a dozen other tablets.

== Text ==
There are five lines on each side, with ~ 230 glyphs altogether.

A pair of fine lines has been ruled across the undamaged end of the tablet on side b. (Side a is too corroded to see this level of detail.) Fischer notes that the end of line Na1 is squeezed into the end of the tablet, and believes that it must therefore be the end of the inscription, with the likely beginning being line Nb5—the opposite of Barthel's presentation. However, Pozdniakov believes that text N is paraphrased in text Ev, which would establish Barthel's sides a and b as recto and verso. The basic correspondences are:

Small Vienna	Keiti
Na2	Ev2
Na3	Ev4
Na4	Ev5
Na5	Ev6
Nb1	Ev7
Nb3	Ev8

However, some of text N may appear more than once on E, so it isn't a simple paraphrase.

Text N has been transcribed by Barthel (1958) and Fischer (1997). Barthel is more precise, as he worked from rubbings. Fischer is more complete, as he worked from the tablet itself and could see details too faint to appear in the rubbings. However, he is known to have made obvious errors on other texts.

Side a

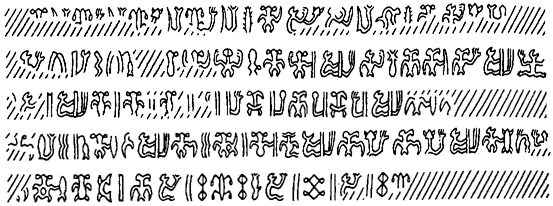
Side a, as traced by Barthel. The lines have been rearranged to reflect English reading order: Na1 at top, Na5 at bottom.

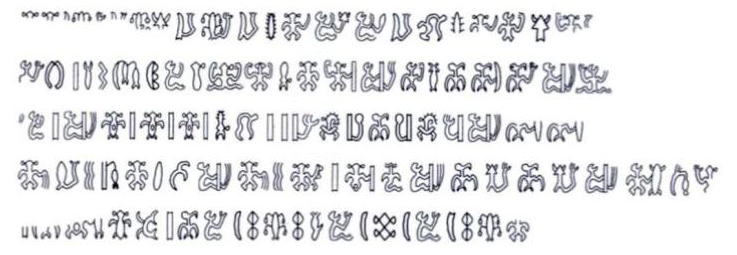
Side a, as traced by Fischer.

Side b

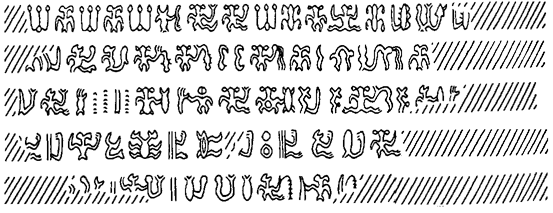
Side b, as traced by Barthel. Nb1 is at top, Nb5 at bottom.

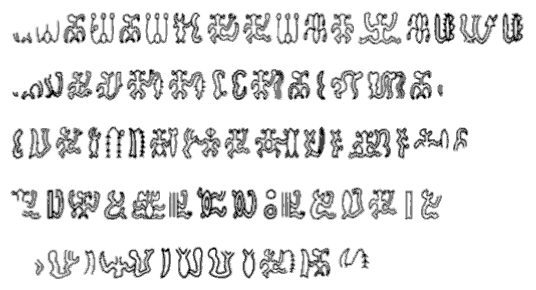
Side b, as traced by Fischer.

== Image gallery ==
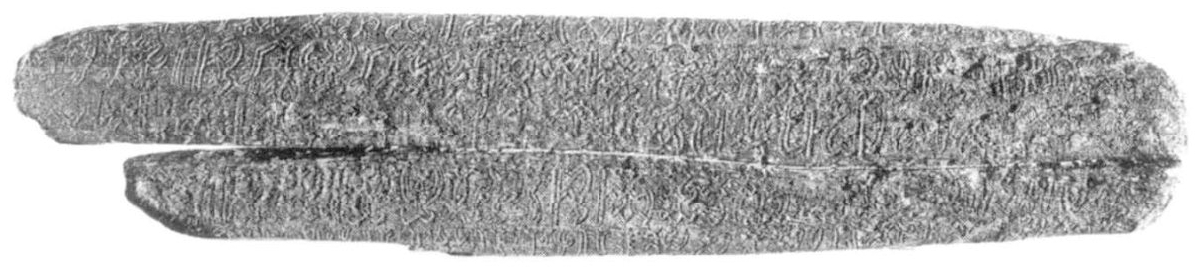
Side a

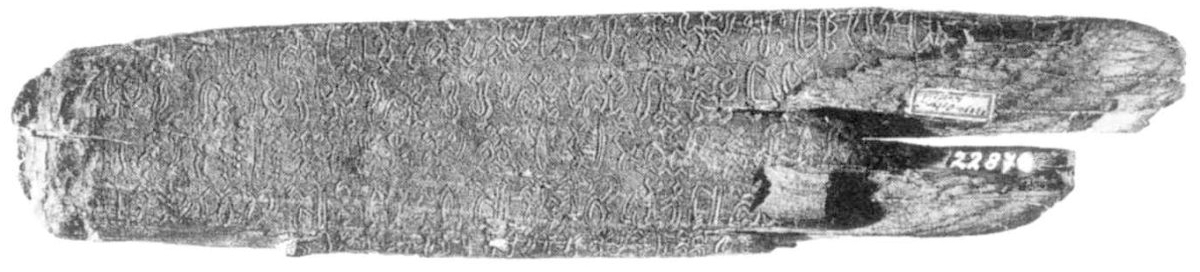
Side b

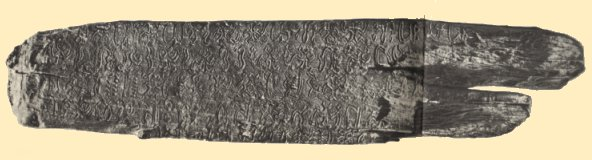
Side b
