= Rongorongo text X =

One of the undeciphered texts of Easter Island

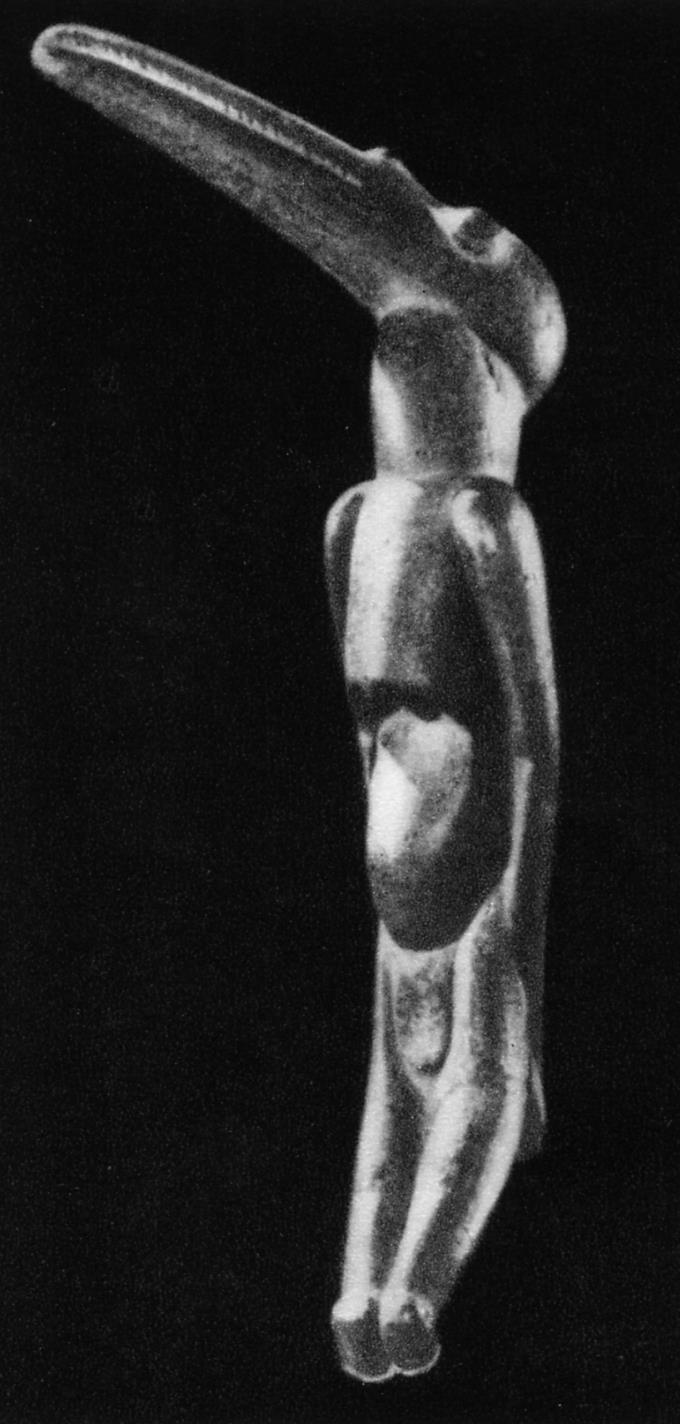
Birdman statuette

Text X of the rongorongo corpus, known as the (New York) Birdman, is one of two dozen surviving rongorongo texts.

== Other names ==
X is the standard designation, from Barthel (1958). Fischer (1997) refers to it as RR25.

== Location ==
American Museum of Natural History, New York. Catalog # ST/5309.

== Description ==
A tangata manu statuette in excellent condition, 33 cm × 8 cm × 6.2 cm (13.0 in × 3.1 in × 2.4 in), of unknown wood. (An old identification of toromiro, as with several other objects so identified, may not be reliable.)

There are seven discrete texts, all but one on the neck inscribed on the right side of the body.

== Provenance ==
The Appleton Sturgis Collection in the USA obtained this statuette at an unknown date and from an unknown source. It was acquired by the American Museum from them somewhere between 1891 and 1893 (Fischer 1997).

Routledge says in her notes that a Rapanui elder told her that all the manu miro ('wood birds') were inscribed with glyphs. However, text X is the only one known (Fischer 1997). Fischer accepts it as genuine and speculates 'Perhaps it was obtained on Rapanui in the first half of the nineteenth century by an American whaler.' However, other scholars have wondered whether the inscription might have been added later.

== Text ==
The seven texts range in length from two to thirteen glyphs, for a total of 38 glyphs.

The glyphs were apparently etched with obsidian but then not finished with a shark tooth, and therefore several of them have been nearly rubbed out over time. However, Fischer (1997) is of the opinion that the glyphs are of 'the highest classical style', and suggests the statuette may have been traded to a passing ship before the inscription was finished.

Fischer
The crown

The lower jaw

The neck

The breast

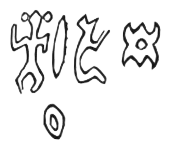
The belly

The flank

The hip/thigh

== Image gallery ==
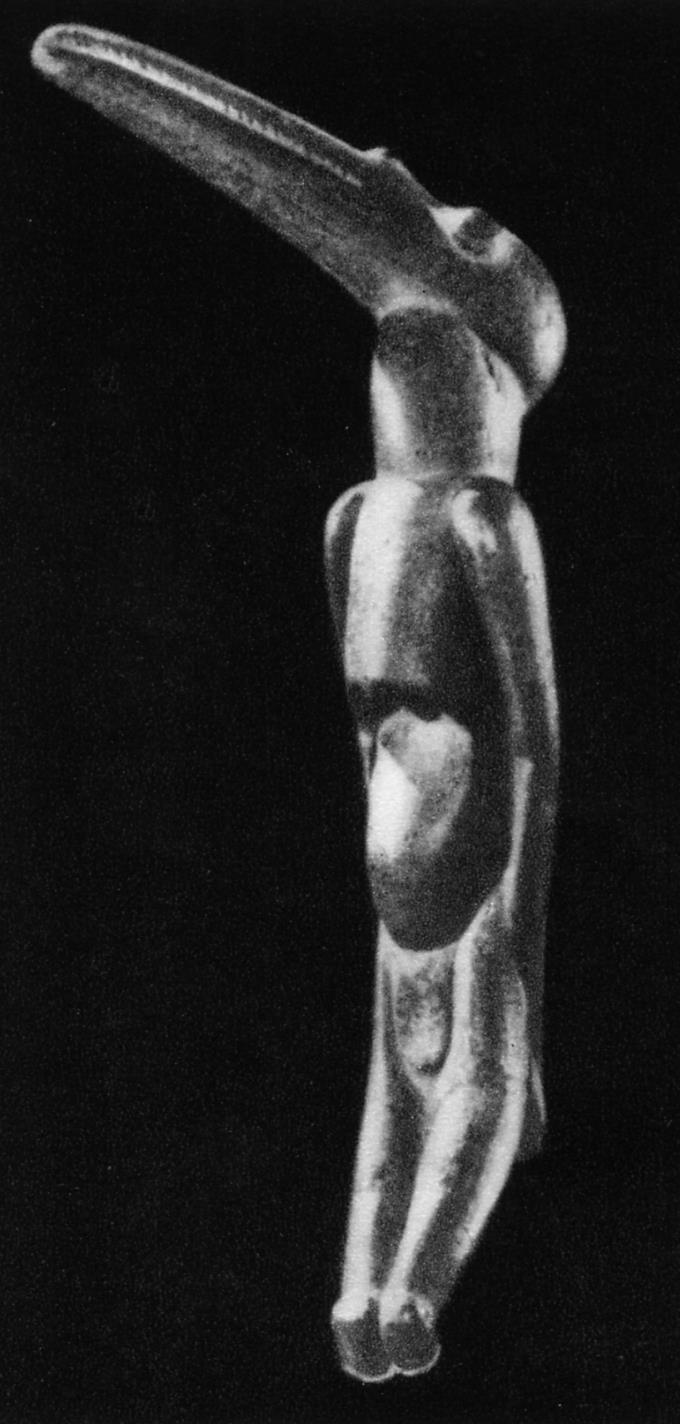
B&W

Closeup of the belly glyphs
