= Rongorongo text L =

One of the undeciphered texts of Easter Island

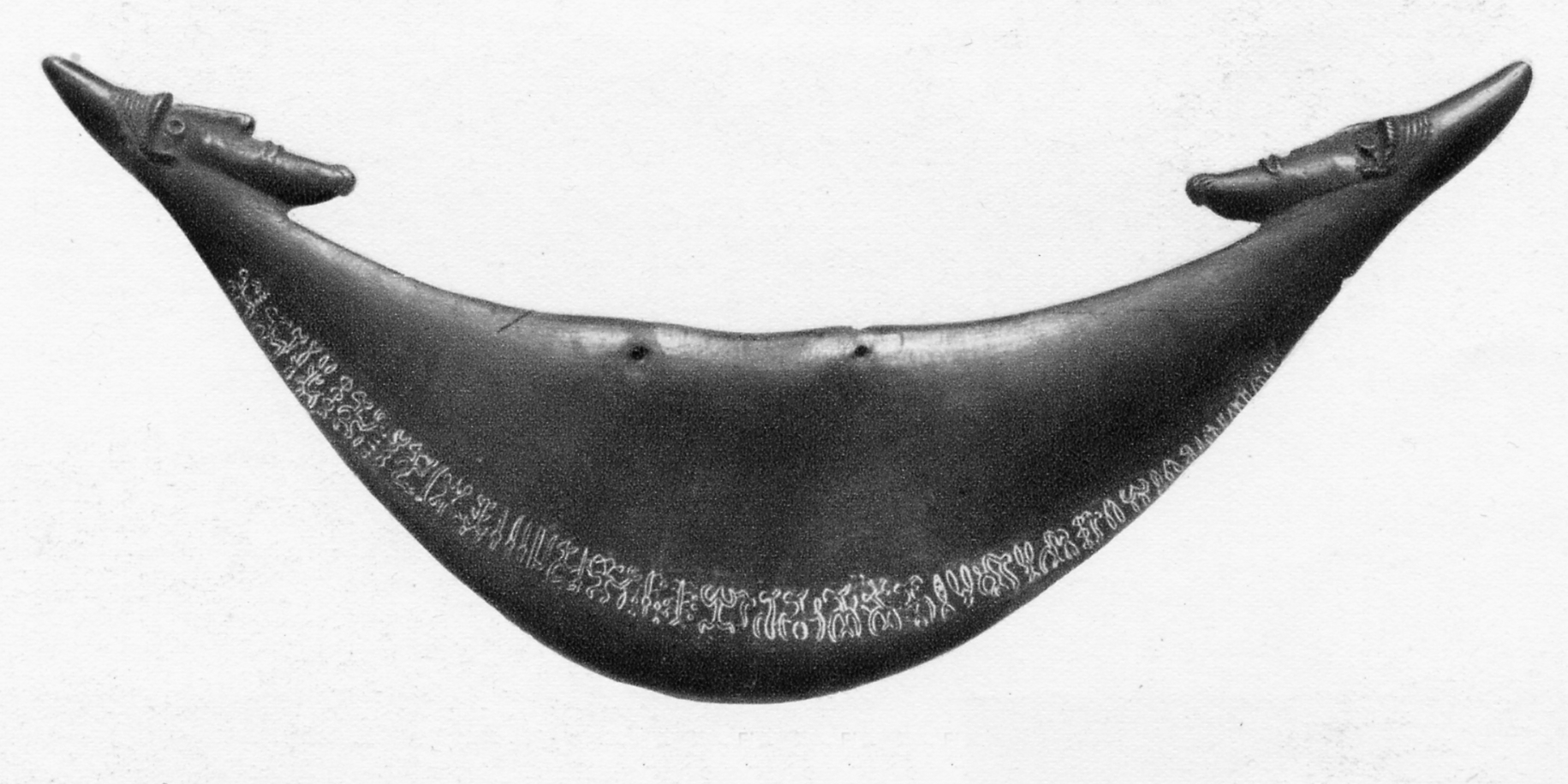

Text L of the rongorongo corpus, also known as (London) reimiro 2, is the smaller of two inscribed reimiro in London and one of two dozen surviving rongorongo texts.

== Other names ==
L is the standard designation, from Barthel (1958). Fischer (1997) refers to it as RR21.

== Location ==
British Museum, London. Catalog # AOA 9295.

== Description ==
A prototypical two-headed Rapanui reimiro, or ceremonial crescent-shaped gorget/epaulet, in excellent condition, 41.2 × 10.5 cm, made of Pacific rosewood (Orliac 2005). The two holes top center were used to hang it from clothing.

A line of glyphs has been cut along the length of the bottom edge on the front.

Fischer reports from her notes that Katherine Routledge showed a photo of this object to two Rapanui elders in July 1914. They said it was a woman's rei miro, worn five to a side.

== Provenance ==
Reimiro 2 was sold by Reverend William Sparrow Simpson, a collector who had never been to Easter Island, to the trustees of Christy Collection in January 1875. The trustees transferred it along with the rest of the Christy ethnological collection to the British Museum in 1883.

It is not known where Simpson acquired the object, but its history may be similar to that of rei miro 1.

Inscribed reimiro were evidently rare: An elder told Routledge that he had never seen a reimiro with glyphs.

Despite its poor provenance, there are no doubts as to its authenticity.

== Text ==
There is one line of about 50 glyphs, ending in half a dozen komari (vulvas). Fischer makes the enigmatic comment "Any evidence in natural light of seemingly 'effaced' glyphs (palimpsests) disappears in artificial light."

Barthel

The inscription, as traced by Barthel.

Fischer

The inscription, as traced by Fischer.

== Image gallery ==
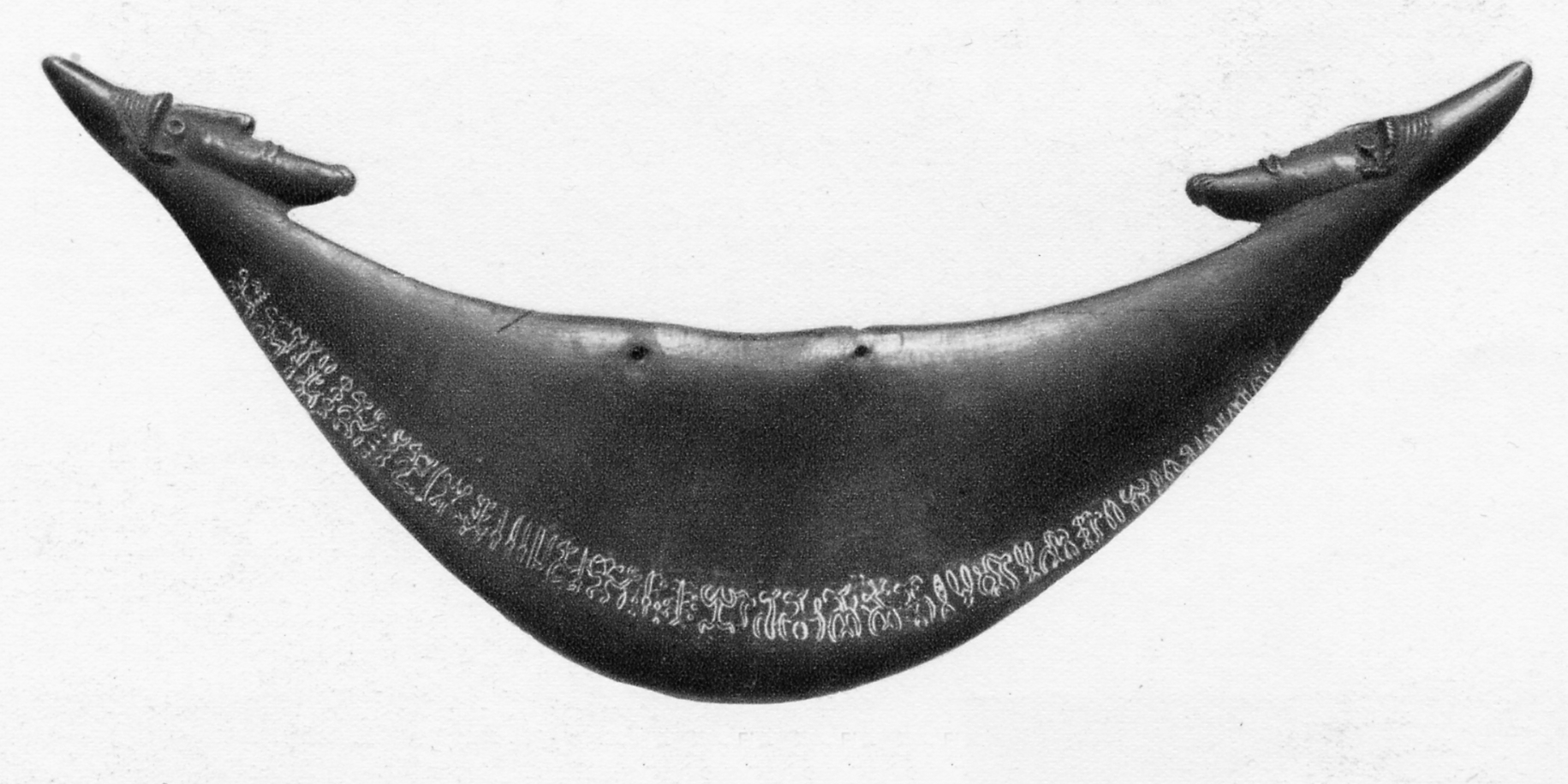
Visible inscription
