= Rongorongo text F =

One of the undeciphered texts of Easter Island

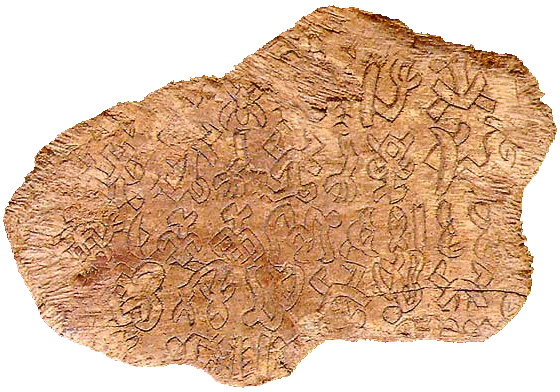

Rongorongo (/ˈrɒŋɡoʊˈrɒŋɡoʊ/; Rapa Nui: [ˈɾoŋoˈɾoŋo]) is a system of glyphs discovered in the 19th century on Easter Island that appears to be writing or proto-writing. Text F of the rongorongo corpus, also known as the (Stephen) Chauvet tablet, is one of two dozen surviving texts.

== Other names ==
F is the standard designation, from Barthel (1958). Fischer (1997) refers to it as RR7.

== Location ==
Sold from the Merton D. Simpson Gallery It is now located in a private collection.

There are no reproductions.

== Description ==
A fragment of a rotted tablet of unknown wood, 11.5 × 8 cm.

There is a label on side b that reads: fragment d'une tablette de l'Ile de Pâques Souvenir de Mgr d'Axiéri, reçu en 1892 (a fragment of a tablet from Easter Island. In memory of Msgr. d'Axiéri, received in 1892).

== Provenance ==
The condition of the wood suggests it was found in a cave or other moist environment. Although Jaussen ("Msgr. d'Axiéri") never mentioned this tablet, and it is not known how or where he acquired it, Thomson noted it during a visit in 1886. Fischer states that it was included in the shipment of Jaussen's effects to the SSCC in Paris in 1892, after his death. In 1930 it was traded to Stéphen Chauvet. Chauvet died in 1950; its location until Arman acquired it c. 1990 is unknown. After Arman's death in 2005 it passed to the private Merton Simpson gallery.

Several scholars, such as Guy, have doubts as to the authenticity of this tablet. However, Fischer believes it to be authentic based on "its provenance, glyphic morphology, and sequences shared with other tablets".

== Text ==
There are six lines of glyphs on each side, though two of those on side b are effaced. Of the ~ 55 glyphs, many are only partly preserved. The label on side b covers a part of the inscription which has never been transcribed. The crude quality of the carving is similar to that of tablet Y.

Barthel

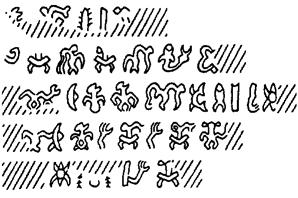
Side a, as traced by Barthel. The lines have been rearranged to reflect English reading order: Fa1 at top, Fa5 at bottom.

Fischer

== Image gallery ==
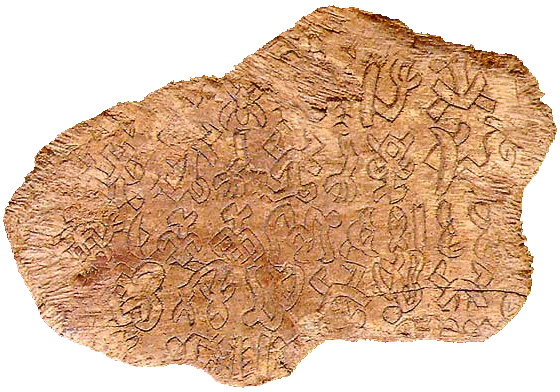
Side a, color

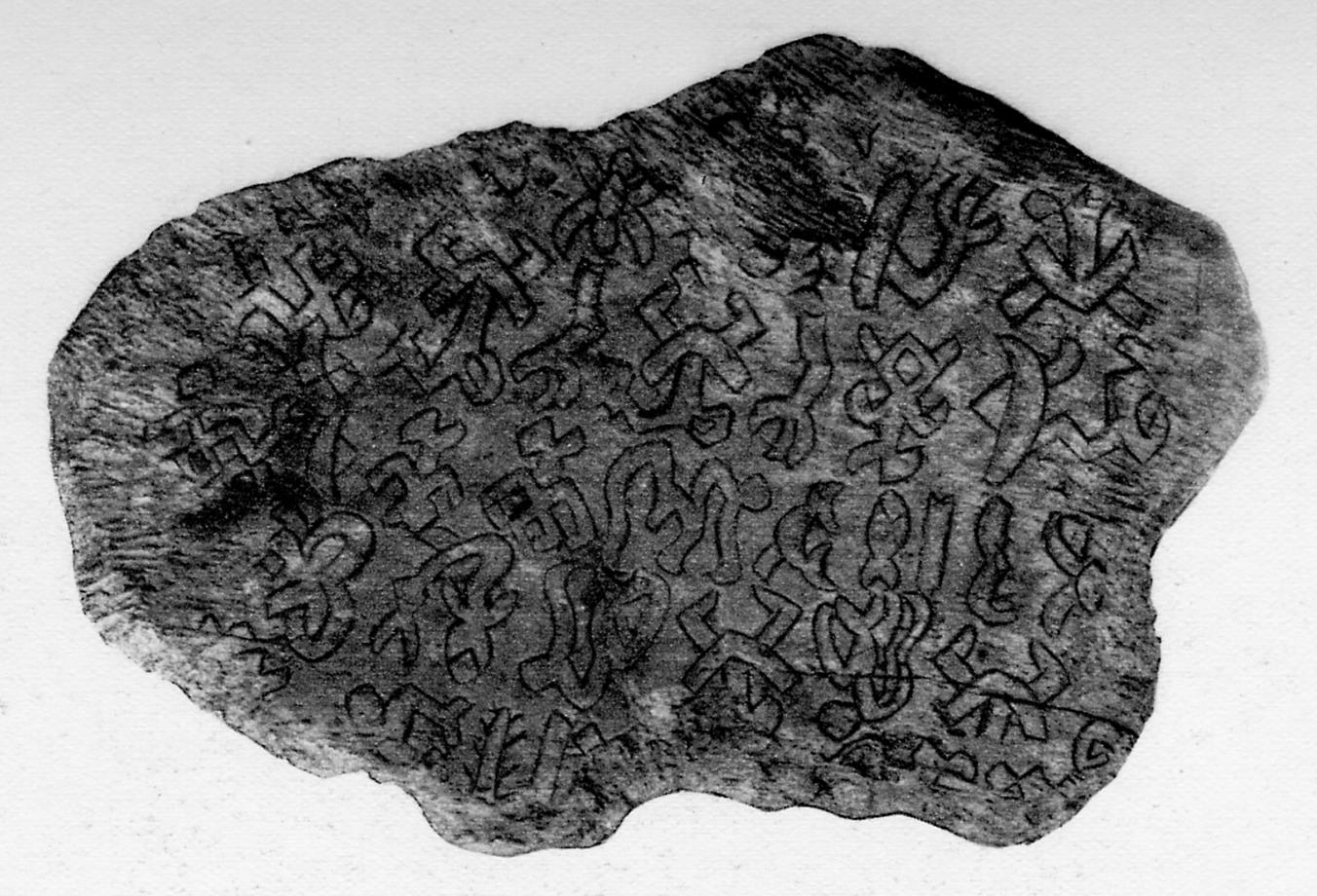
Side a, traced

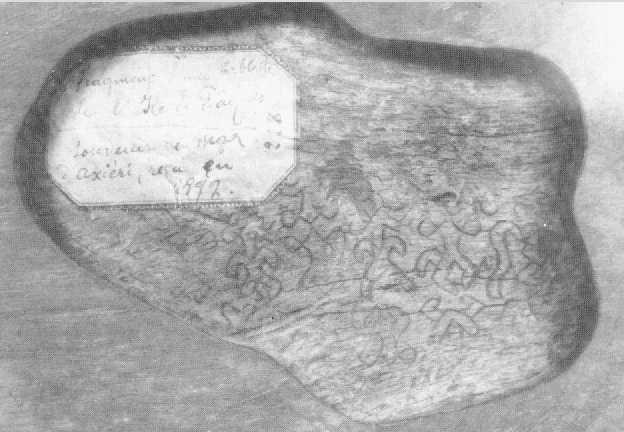
Side b, showing label
