= Rongorongo text O =

Text in the rongorongo glyph corpus

Text O of the rongorongo corpus, the Berlin tablet, is one of two dozen surviving rongorongo texts.

== Other names ==
O is the standard designation, from Barthel (1958). Fischer (1997) refers to it as RR22.

It is also known as the Boomerang because of its bent shape.

== Location ==
Museum für Völkerkunde, Berlin. Catalog # VI 4878 (Inventory # I 3/83).

== Description ==
A fluted piece of gnarled driftwood, 103 × 12.5/10 × 5.2 cm, this is the most massive rongorongo artifact to survive, as well as the most fragile. It was heavily weathered before inscription, and later it was burnt in five places and lay on side b in damp soil, probably in a cave. Fischer (1997) reports that bits flake off upon handling, and in parts even the fluting is no longer distinguishable.

Fischer (1997) believes that it was once a 'marvelous' piece, a fluted version of the Santiago Staff.

== Provenance ==
In 1882 an archaeological expedition aboard the SMS Hyäne visited Easter Island, and captain Wilhelm Geiseler purchased two tablets. The purchase had been arranged by Schlubach, the German consul in Valparaíso, at the request of Adolf Bastian, the director of the Königliches Museum für Völkerkunde in Berlin. The tablets were given to the uncle of Schlubach's wife, Alexander Salmon, Jr, who then shipped three tablets, M, N, and O, to Schlubach. When Schlubach returned to Hamburg in 1883, he sent just this one tablet to Bastian.

== Text ==
There are seven visible lines of glyphs on side a, with traces of eleven or twelve (if the edge was used) altogether; on side b there are traces of fluting for thirteen lines, or perhaps fourteen if the edge was used.

No glyphs can be identified on side b (Fischer 1997:497). On side a, Fischer counts ~ 187 glyphs from personal examination and an 1883 sketch by Bastian, many of which cannot be reliably identified. He estimates the original text held 1,200 to 1,300 glyphs. He hopes that a 'substantial amount' of text may be recovered through computer enhancement.

Fischer

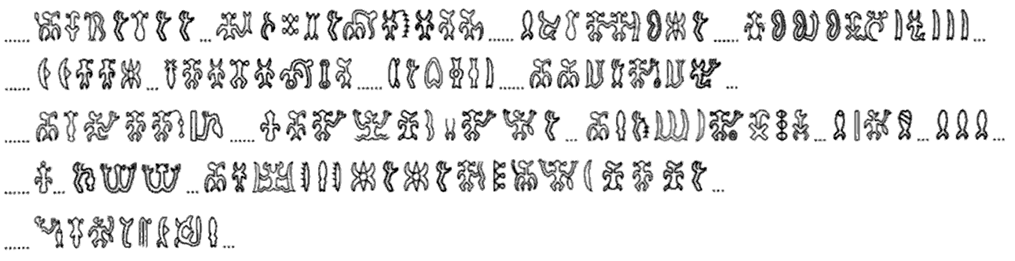

Part of side a, as traced by Fischer. The lines have been rearranged to reflect English reading order: Oa5 at top, Oa9 at bottom. (The first two legible lines are missing from this image.)

Barthel

== Image gallery ==
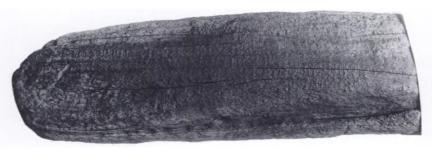
End

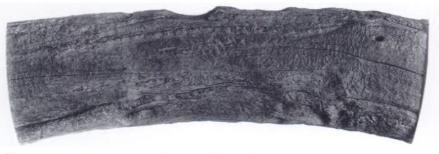
Middle

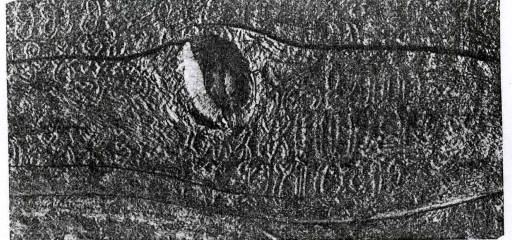
Section with knothole
