= Rongorongo text U =

One of the undeciphered texts of Easter Island

Text U of the rongorongo corpus, carved on a beam, also known as Honolulu tablet 2 or Honolulu 3628, is one of two dozen surviving rongorongo texts.

== Other names ==
U is the standard designation, from Barthel (1958). Fischer (1997) refers to it as RR12.

== Location ==
Bernice P. Bishop Museum, Honolulu. Catalog #B.03623 (misidentified as # B.03628 in some sources).

== Description ==
A charred, worm-eaten, and heavily corroded beam, 70.5 × 8 × 2.6 cm of unknown wood. Not fluted. The area of visible inscription on side a (pictured) measures 14 × 5 cm, punctuated with a knothole.

Métraux (1938) said of the Honolulu tablets T and U that,

Probably these tablets were kept for some time in a cave, and the side lying on the ground was greatly injured by the damp soil.

== Provenance ==
Collector J. L. Young of Auckland purchased three of the Honolulu tablets circa 1888 "from Rapanui through a reliable agent", who Fischer thinks was probably Alexander Salmon, Jr. It was transferred to the Bishop Museum in August 1920.

== Contents ==
As with Échancrée, the two sides are written in different hands: Side a is written with "large plain glyphs", while side b has "small fine glyphs" 5 mm high.

== Text ==
Out of six lines of glyphs on side a, parts of four are visible; out of ten lines on side b, part of one is visible. Some 62 glyphs are preserved. As the two sides were written by different hands, the distinction of recto vs. verso may be irrelevant.
