= Rongorongo text M =

Tablet in the rongorongo corpus

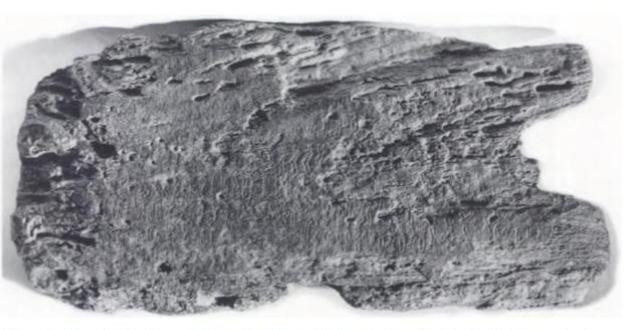

Text M of the rongorongo corpus, the larger of two tablets in Vienna and therefore also known as the Large or Great Vienna tablet, is one of two dozen surviving rongorongo texts.

== Other names ==
M is the standard designation, from Barthel (1958). Fischer (1997) refers to it as RR24.

== Location ==
Museum für Völkerkunde, Vienna. Catalog # 22869.

There is a reproduction in the Musée de l'Homme, Paris.

== Description ==
A rotted unfluted tablet of Pacific rosewood (Orliac 2005), 28.4 × 13.7 × 2.5 cm, M is one of the rongorongo tablets in the worst condition. It evidently lay on side b in damp soil, probably in a cave, for many years. The edges are rotted and the surfaces worm-eaten. Fischer suggests that the gashes on the top and side may have been intentional, for lashings.

== Provenance ==
In 1882 an archaeological expedition aboard the SMS Hyäne visited Easter Island, and captain Wilhelm Geiseler purchased two tablets. The purchase had been arranged by Schlubach, the German consul in Valparaíso, at the request of Adolf Bastian, the director of the Königliches Museum für Völkerkunde in Berlin. The tablets were given to the uncle of Schlubach's wife, Alexander Salmon, Jr, who then shipped three tablets, M, N, and O, to Schlubach. Several years later, when Schlubach returned to Hamburg, he sent just one of the tablets to Bastian and sold the other two privately to the Hamburg firm "Klée und Kocher". They were then sold to the Austrian Vice-Consul in Hamburg, Heinrich Freiherr von Westenholz, who donated them to Vienna's Museum für Völkerkunde in 1886.

Alexander Salmon, Jr, the manager of the Brander plantations on Easter Island who had transcribed and (poorly) translated the 'readings' that Jaussen obtained for his texts, encouraged the manufacture of Rapanui artworks, and several scholars have questioned its authenticity. However, he never presented them as authentic, and Fischer accepts this text as genuine.

== Content ==
Although there is little text to go on, Fischer reports that line Mr2 shares two sequences of glyphs with Gr2 of the Small Santiago tablet, which he suggests may have been the model for the Large Vienna.

== Text ==
Nine lines of ~ 120 glyphs are visible on side a; side b is 'destroyed'. Fischer says that M apparently once held c. 11 lines of text on either side, much like "Mamari". Line a7 has 'faint traces' of glyphs which Fischer believes might be recoverable with electronic imaging.

Fischer also reports (p. 398) that M has suffered recent damage:

It is sad to have to report that between 1933, when Paul Rivet had a plaster cast (M.H. 33.79.2) of this tablet made for his Musée d'Ethnologie (now Musée de l'Homme) in Paris, and 1992, when I inspected the original in Vienna, great damage had occurred. The sequence is now missing from the middle top line of the tablet […]. What is far worse, however: someone has also apparently intentionally removed a piece from the tablet that contained parts of two lines of glyphs. Some 13 elements of [M]a1 and three of [M]a2—a fragment c. 7 × 2 cm in size—are now missing.
