= Rongorongo text Z =

Text Z of the rongorongo corpus, also known as Poike, is a palimpsest inscription that may be one of two dozen surviving rongorongo texts. The authenticity of the upper text is in question.

== Other names ==
Z is the standard designation, continuing from Barthel (1958). Fischer (1997) numbers it among the imitative pieces made for tourists as T4.

== Location ==
Chilean National Museum of Natural History, Santiago. Catalog # 12060.

== Description ==
A small light-weight piece, 10.7 × 5.8 × 2.7 cm, of unknown wood and darkened with age. One end has been beveled to a sharp edge, the other, broken off and smoothed. Side a is badly cracked. It is the smallest intact piece.

== Provenance ==
In 1937 José Paté discovered this tablet by the foundations of the ruins of a stone house near ahu Mahatua, the home village of Metoro Tauꞌa Ure, Bishop Jaussen's informant, at the base of Poike Volcano, near the cave Aka o Keke that contains a few crude rongorongo-type petroglyphs. Paté gave the tablet to Father Sebastian, who then donated it to the Santiago museum in 1938.

The authenticity of the piece is immediately suspect because it is not boustrophedon, typical of early forgeries. However, Fischer (1997) suspects that it may be a palimpsest, that someone had carved an imitative inscription over an authentic but by then illegible text, and that it was somehow forgotten rather than sold. It may have also been an attempt to revive rongorongo for personal reasons.

== Text ==
Fischer (1997) reports that in strong light four lines of imitative (crude, non-boustrophedon) script are visible on both sides, but that "in indirect light there are fainter traces of smaller rongorongo glyphs in six or seven lines on each side." The smaller hand implies a second scribe. Even the cruder glyphs are only partially legible, with some 55 "trace elements" remaining.

Barthel

Barthel did not transcribe this text.

Fischer

Fischer does not believe the legible text to be genuine, and was unable to transcribe the underlying text.
