= Rongorongo text Q =

One of the undeciphered texts of Easter Island

Text Q of the rongorongo corpus, the smaller of two tablets in St. Petersburg and therefore also known as the Small St Petersburg tablet, is one of two dozen surviving rongorongo texts, and one of three recording the so-called "Grand Tradition".

== Other names ==
Q is the standard designation, from Barthel (1958). Fischer (1997) refers to it as RR17.

== Location ==
Peter the Great Museum of Anthropology and Ethnography, St Petersburg. Catalog # 402/13-1.

There are reproductions in the Musée de l'Homme, Paris; the Museum für Völkerkunde, Berlin; and the American Museum of Natural History, New York.

== Description ==
A fluted tablet in poor condition, 44 × 9 × 2.3 cm, made out of a crooked piece of Pacific rosewood (Orliac 2005). One end has been cut off. There is clay smeared on parts of the tablets which obscures some sequences. The left end of recto line 6 has been gouged out, and a segment has been cut out of line 1 along the bottom edge. The verso has been burnt in spots, the center has been eroded off, and Fischer reports that a large area has been lost since Barthel transcribed it in the 1950s.

== Provenance ==
The Small St Petersburg tablet was obtained by Russian anthropologist Nicholai Miklukho-Maklai in July 1871 on Tahiti while on board the Vityaz. He may have bought it from one of the indentured Rapanui at the Brander plantation. On 30 December 1888, the day before his death, both tablets to the Russian Geographical Society of St Petersburg, which permanently lent them to the museum in 1891.

Orliac (2005) carbon dated the wood to sometime after 1680 CE, though we cannot be sure the text dates from that period.

== Contents ==
Barthel (1958) called tablets H, P, and Q the "Grand Tradition" because of their extensive shared sequences. Since many of these appear on the same lines, Fischer believes one served in part, directly or indirectly, as the model for the others, and that they may have had a common geographic origin.

== Text ==
Nine lines on each side display ~ 900 glyphs, out of an original total of ~ 1,100. Fischer reports that some glyphs have been "corrected". The reading order of the parallel texts H, P, and Q is well established.

Barthel

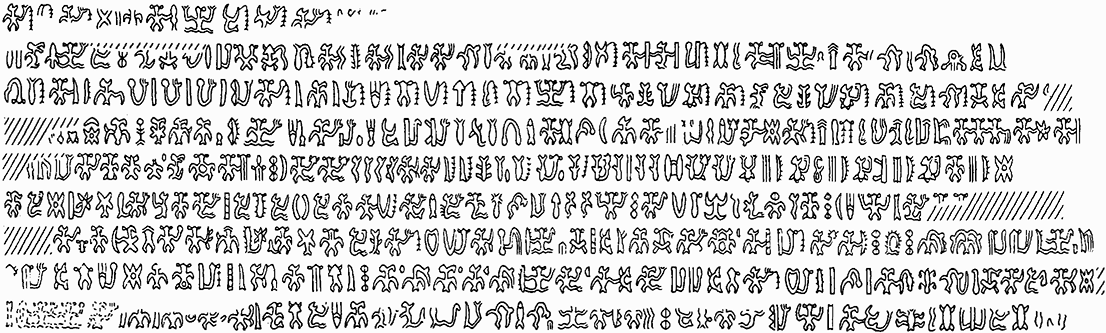
Recto, as traced by Barthel. The lines have been rearranged to reflect English reading order: Qr1 at top, Qr9 at bottom.
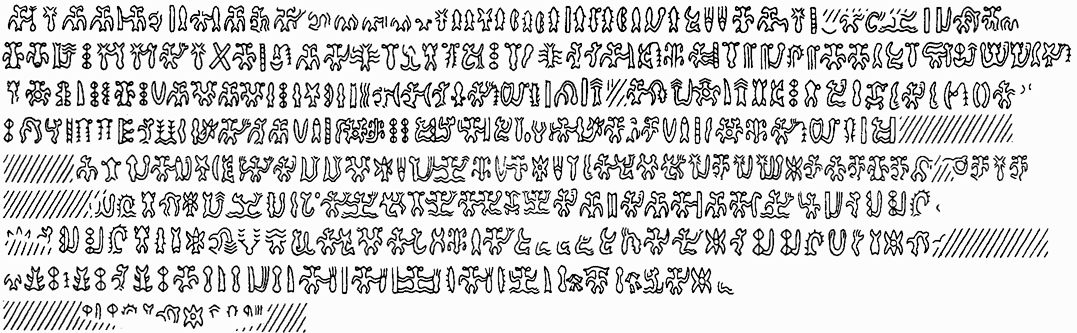
Verso, as traced by Barthel: Qv1 at top, Qv9 at bottom.

Fischer

== Image gallery ==
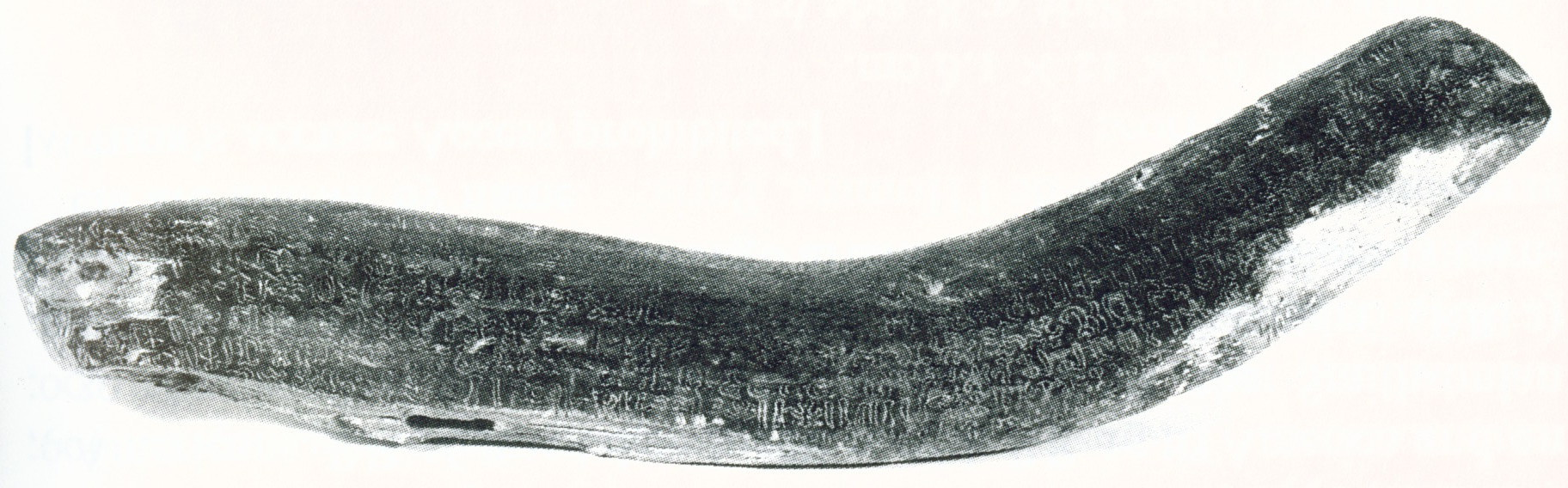
Verso
