= Flag of Easter Island =

Chilean territorial flag

Easter Island
- "Te Reva Reimiro"
- Use: Civil and state flag
- Proportion: 5:8
- Adopted: 1880; 146 years ago (Kingdom of Easter Island); May 9, 2006; 20 years ago (Isla de Pascua commune)
- Design: A white flag with a red reimiro in the centre

The flag of Easter Island (Rapa Nui: Te Reva Reimiro or Te Reva Rapa Nui, Spanish: Isla de Pascua) consists of a white banner with a red reimiro. In addition to the island itself, the flag is also used to symbolize the indigenous Rapa Nui people. It was first flown in public alongside the national flag of Chile on 9 May 2006.

== Description ==
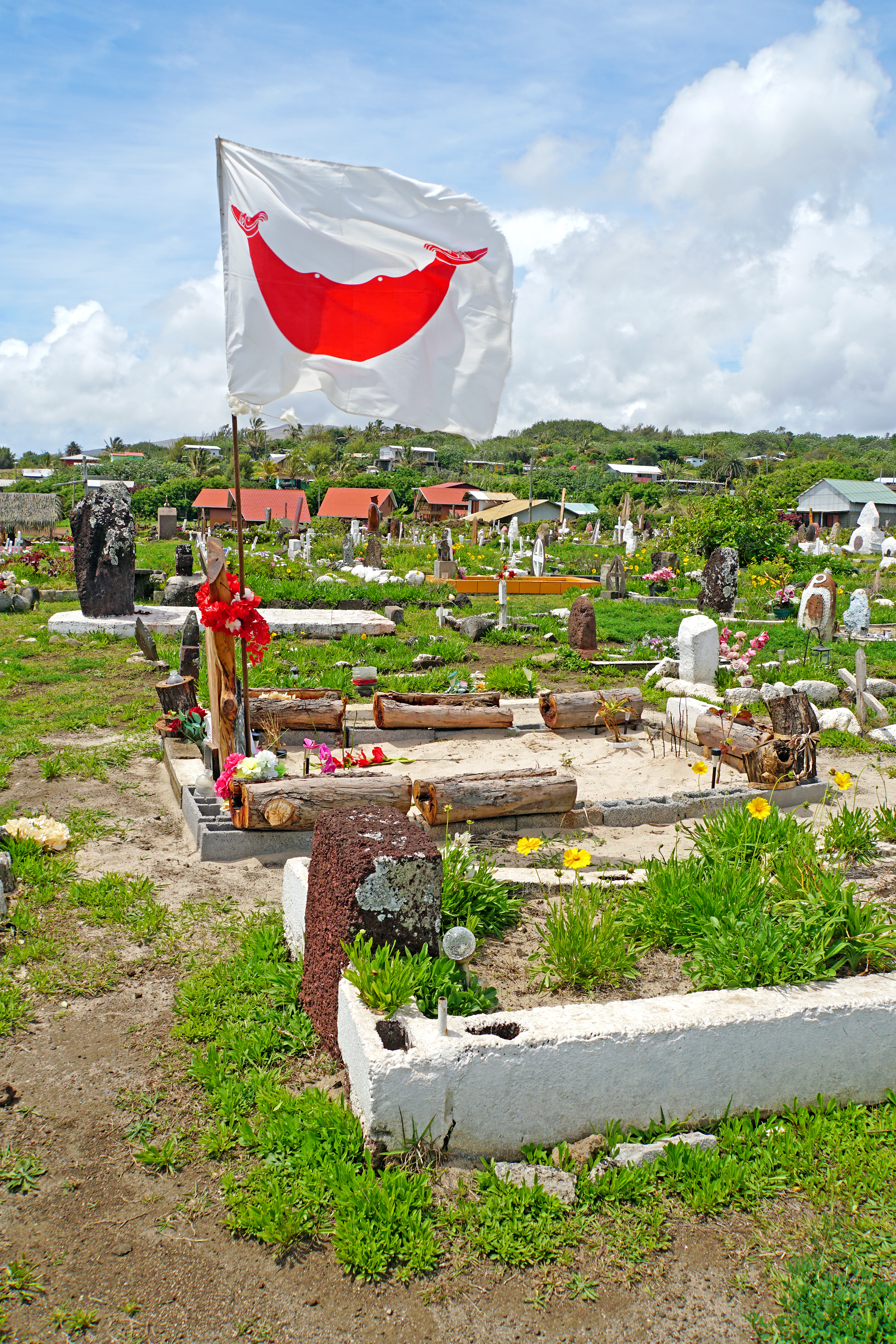
Easter Island flag at the Hanga Roa cemetery.

The flag of Rapa Nui is white and features in its center a reimiro (a wooden pectoral ornament once worn by the people of Rapa Nui) painted in red (mana), a symbol of power, with two anthropomorphic figures at its edges, representing the ariki (chiefs, nobles).

== History ==
A solid white flag used in the 1860s

SSCC Rapa Nui mission flag (c. 1866)

Dutrou-Bornier's flag (1869–1876)

Old reimiro flag (1880–1888)

French missionaries in 1866 described the Rapa Nui flag as white, and they mentioned that the SSCC mission used a flag with a red cross on the island:

"It is worth noting that alongside the French flag was the Rapa Nui flag, but also the mission flag: "When the ship sees the mission flag (a white flag with a red cross in the middle)." This reference also appears in 1864, when they set out to search for Eugenie Eyraud: "A little later, we saw many people on the island, coming and going in all directions. Soon the beach was covered with people. A white flag, raised on land, indicated where we should anchor and announced a peaceful reception." When Eugenie Eyraud's brother was buried: "Mr. Bornier and all his men, as well as almost all the inhabitants of the island, attended the funeral. Our Rapa Nui flag, after covering the coffin during the ceremony, was raised as a sign of mourning."

In 1869, the most powerful person on the island became the sheep farmer Jean-Baptiste Dutrou-Bornier. When Dutrou-Bornier came into conflict with the missionaries, he formed the Rapa Nui militia, which he allowed to return to traditional beliefs. Shortly thereafter, Dutrou-Bornier declared himself king of the island and ruled despotically until his sudden death in 1876. During this period, a new flag was made for the island, which depicted the outline of a Tangata manu on an orange background.

In 1880, the heavily depopulated Rapa Nui community began using a new white flag with a red reimiro. According to later oral traditions, black Tangata manu also appeared on the flag of that time. This flag was created when the business after Dutrou-Bornier was taken over by Tahitian Prince Alexander Ariʻipaea Salmon and some of the exiled Catholics returned.

Flag used after the Chilean annexation (until 1902)

Flag of Easter Island commune (until 2006)

In 1888, Chile annexed the island and Policarpo Toro raised the Chilean flag. The Rapa Nui continued to consider themselves a self-governing protectorate and used their own flag, although the island's lessor, Enrique Merlet, forbade its display.

After the arrival of the training ship General Baquedano in 1902, the islanders raised a modified version of the Chilean flag. This version, with inverted colors, depicted a cross above a mitre and the Sacred Hearts of Jesus and Mary in the canton, flanked by pair of vertical red reimiros. After the visit, the Chilean national flags were flown again. The Rapa Nui flag was taken to the Valparaíso Museum, but a fire at the museum destroyed it in 1906.

For many years, the reimiro flag was unofficially used by the island's Rapa Nui to represent their island. However, the official flag was the white and gold flag of the Municipality of Easter Island. In 2006, it was upgraded to a Special Territory and optional use of the Rapa Nui name was allowed in government documents for the first time, with the reimiro flag adopted as the entity's flag.
