= Rongorongo text J =

Inscribed text from Easter Island

Text J of the rongorongo corpus, also known as (London) reimiro 1, is the larger of two inscribed reimiro in London and one of two dozen surviving rongorongo texts. It is also the shortest text in the corpus, being only two glyphs long.

== Other names ==
J is the standard designation, from Barthel (1958). Fischer (1997) refers to it as RR20.

== Location ==
British Museum, London. Catalog # AOA 6847.

== Description ==
A prototypical two-headed Rapanui reimiro, or ceremonial crescent-shaped gorget/epaulet, 73 × 13.2 cm, of unknown wood. There are a few worm trails, but it is in excellent condition. The two holes top center were used to hang it from clothing.

Two glyphs are cut into the top center of the front, between the two holes used to hang it.

== Provenance ==
The British Museum catalog states:

Presented by [Augustus] W. Franks Esq. Aug. 2. 1870. Obtained by Dr Comrie from the master of a vessel which brought it from Easter Island.

A label on the back reads:

6847. Easter Id. Pres. by A. W. Franks Esq. 8.8.70. Comrie [Collection].

Fischer says that the phrase "the master of a vessel" suggests that it was acquired before the Chilean slaving raids of 1862-63, probably during the 1820s to 1840s, the most active whaling period in the South Pacific.

Inscribed reimiro were evidently rare: An elder told Routledge that he had never seen a reimiro with glyphs.

Despite its poor provenance, there are no doubts as to its authenticity.

== Text ==
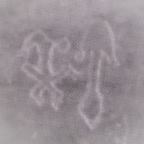
Rubbing of the text.

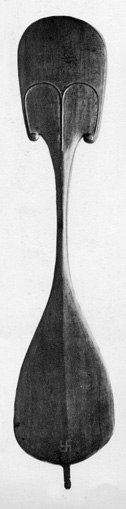
A Rapa Nui rapa.

One compound glyph, the shortest of Barthel's 26 texts.

The second glyph is "clearly" a rapa, or ceremonial dance paddle. It appears to be held by a human figure, glyph 530, with what might be a headdress.
