= Rongorongo text W =

One of the undeciphered texts of Easter Island

The fragmentary text W of the rongorongo corpus, also known as Honolulu tablet 4 or Honolulu 445, is one of two dozen surviving rongorongo texts.

== Other names ==
W is the standard designation, from Barthel (1958). Fischer (1997) refers to it as RR14.

== Location ==
Bernice P. Bishop Museum, Honolulu. Catalog #B.00445 .

== Description ==
A small corroded fragment, 6.7 × 2.3 × 0.7 cm, of unknown wood, not fluted.

== Provenance ==
Lieutenant F. M. Symonds of the USS Mohican acquired this fragment in 1886 while surveying Easter Island. He does not appear to have reported it, and later that year gave it to a Mrs Walter M. Gifford (the Bishop Museum writes "Giffard") of Honolulu. The Gifford family donated it to the Bishop Museum in 1914 (Fischer 1997).

== Text ==
Some fourteen "very small, chubby glyphs" are visible on the four lines of side a, of which only three are complete. Side b is unknown since the fragment is kept in a protective glass case, and evidently no one has ever investigated the reverse (Fischer 1997).
