= CEIPP =

The C.E.I.P.P., or the Centre (formerly Cercle) d'Etudes sur l'île de Pâques et la Polynésie ("Study Centre (formerly "Circle") on Easter Island and Polynesia") is a geographic and anthropological group created by André Valenta and Michel-Alain Jumeau.

The CEIPP is notable for its members' publications on Easter Island. These include:

- Nouveau Regard sur l'île de Pâques, a collective work published by Moana Editions, Saintry-sur-Seine, 1982
- Les Mystères Résolus de l'île de Pâques, a collective work published by Editions Step, Évry, 1993. ISBN 2-9508078-0-1
- Michel-Alain Jumeau and Yves Pioger's Bibliographie de l'île de Pâques. Publications de la Société des Océanistes, nº46, Musée de l'Homme, Paris, 1997. ISBN 2-85430-004-1.

The CEIPP also houses the Thomas Barthel archives of rongorongo, making the data available in digitized format, cross-checking his line drawings of the rongorongo corpus with available photographs and the rubbings he used, and expanding his list of glyphs and his glyph-referencing system.

They publish the Bulletin du Centre d'études sur l'île de Pâques et la Polynésie.
