= Rongorongo text Y =

One of the undeciphered texts of Easter Island

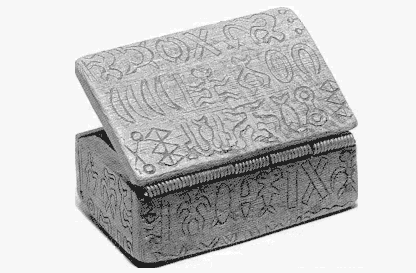

Text Y of the rongorongo corpus, known as the Paris Snuff Box, is one of two dozen surviving rongorongo texts.

== Other names ==
Y is the standard designation, continuing from Barthel (1958). Fischer (1997) refers to it as RR5.

The nickname in French is La Tabatière.

== Location ==
Musée de l'Homme, Paris. Catalog # 62-47-5.

== Description ==
A single unfluted tablet or part of a tablet, cut into pieces and assembled into a snuff box, 71 × 46–47 × 26–28 mm. It is variously said to be made from foreign driftwood or Pacific rosewood. The glyphs that remain, though crudely carved with a steel blade, are in excellent condition, except in the center of the bottom piece where they have been worn down. There are no glyphs on the inside, as the tablet was planed down to a thickness of 4–5 mm before being cut into pieces (Fischer 1997:497).

The panels of the snuff box (not in the correct orientation)

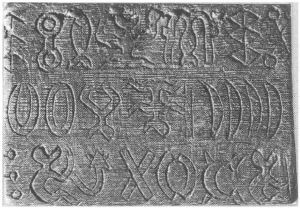

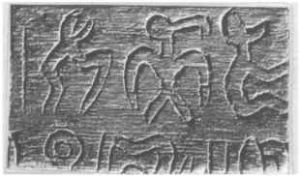

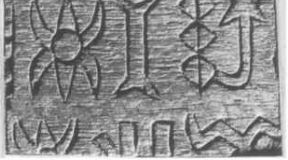

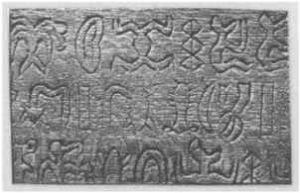

== Provenance ==
Although the provenance for this object is not good, and being cut with a steel blade makes it suspect, both Métraux and Barthel believed it to be undoubtedly genuine. One reason is that it contains the rare glyph 36 and the rare compounds 38 and 684, and so is an unlikely forgery, though Barthel found out about it too late to include it in his catalogue. It was sold to the Musée de I'Homme in December 1961 by one Henry Reichlen, who had acquired it from a French family who had owned it for several generations — eighty years, by their count.

The box was presumably made by a sailor who did not recognize the value of the tablet. Since snuffboxes were more popular in the early part of the nineteenth century than later, when cigarettes became popular, it would likely have been acquired earlier than most surviving rongorongo texts.

== Contents ==
The snuffbox has the repeated 380.1 glyph found on half a dozen other tablets which suggests it contains a list.

== Text ==
The top has three lines of glyphs, the bottom 2½, the four sides 1½. There are about 90 glyphs in all, many cut in half. Except for the front and back, which share a line cut lengthwise, the original relationship of the sections is not known.

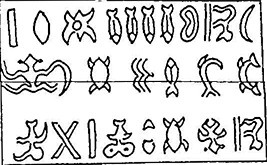
The front and rear panels of the box, fit back together

Barthel

Barthel (1958) did not transcribe this text, though he later accepted it as authentic.

Fischer

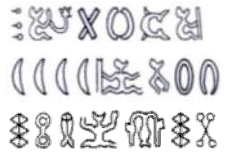
Top. The last glyph of the third row (36, the cross) is rare, as is the third to last (684, a fish with two bird heads).

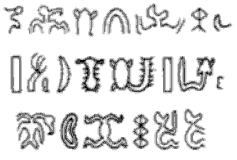
Bottom. The third glyph of the third row (38, a bulb with four wavy "legs", top and bottom) is rare.

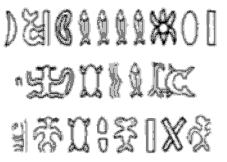
Front and back, rejoined.
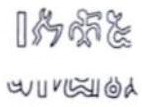
Right side, as seen from the front.

Left side, as seen from the front.

== Image gallery ==
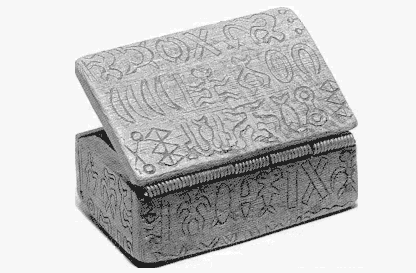
B&W

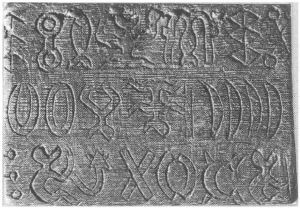
Top (side a)

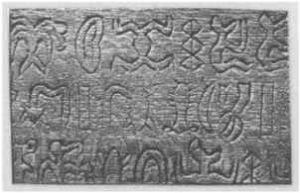
Bottom (side b)

Front (side c)

Back (side d)

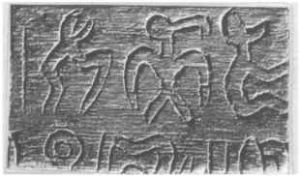
Right side (from front) (side e)

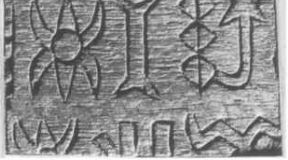
Left side (from front) (side f)
