= Métraux =

Métraux is a surname. Notable people with the surname include:

- Alfred Métraux (1902–1963), Swiss-Argentine anthropologist, ethnologist and human rights leader
- Kim Métraux (born 1995), Swiss golfer
- Morgane Métraux (born 1997), Swiss golfer
- Rhoda Métraux (1914–2003), American anthropologist
