= Reimiro =

Crescent-shaped pectoral ornament of Easter Island

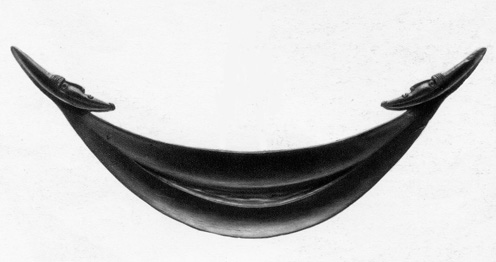
An old rei miro, with human faces on each end. This is the inner side, which was once filled with chalk.

A reimiro is a crescent-shaped pectoral ornament once worn by the people of Easter Island. The name comes from the Rapanui rei ('stern' or 'prow') and miro ('boat'). Thus the crescent represents a Polynesian canoe.

Each side of the reimiro ended in a human face. The outer, display side had two small pierced bumps through which a cord was strung for hanging it. The inner side contained a cavity that was filled with chalk made from powdered seashells.

A reimiro provides the image of the Flag of Rapa Nui (Easter Island). It also appears to feature in the rongorongo script of Easter Island (as glyph 07:), and one reimiro is preserved with a long rongorongo text.

Although the human faces on the reimiro are unique to Easter Island, the pectoral itself is part of a wider tradition. In the Solomon Islands, for example, women wear shell pectorals which resemble reimiro.

== Gallery ==
A reimiro is the emblem of the Flag of Rapa Nui.

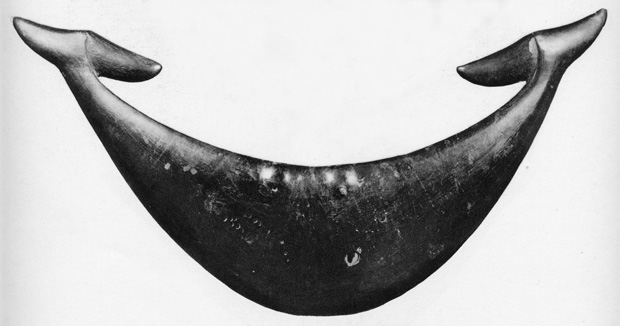
A large (61 cm) reimiro with very stylized faces. It may be that pectorals of this size were worn by men.

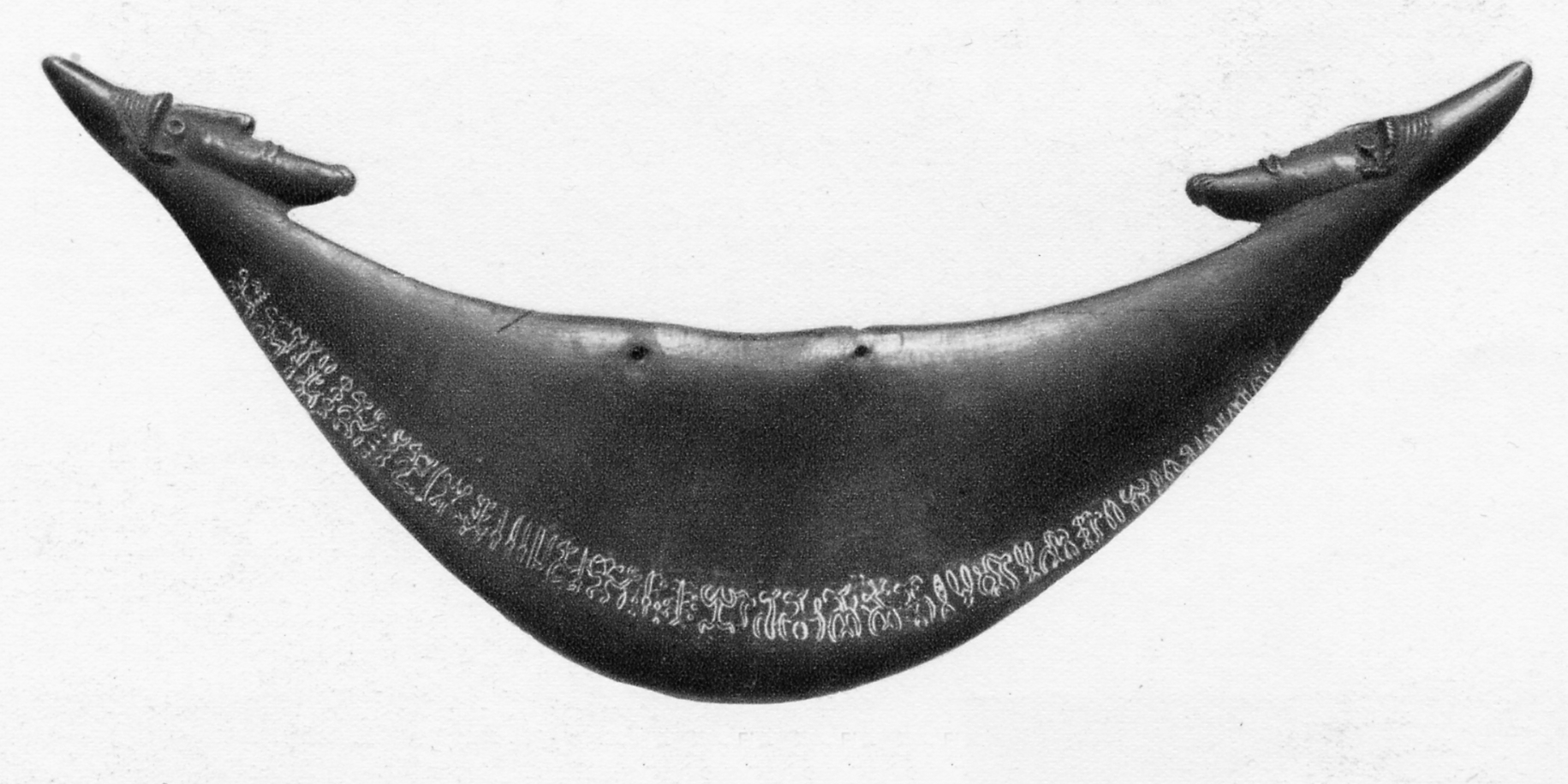
A reimiro inscribed with rongorongo glyphs

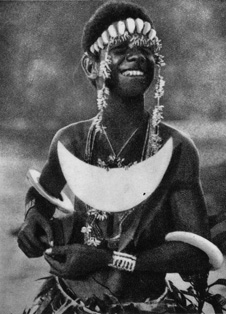
A Solomon Islands woman wearing a shell pectoral resembling a reimiro
