= Rongorongo text H =

One of the undeciphered texts of Easter Island

Text H of the rongorongo corpus, the larger of two tablets located in Santiago and therefore also known as the Great or Large Santiago tablet, is one of two dozen surviving rongorongo texts, and one of three recording the so-called "Grand Tradition".

== Other names ==
H is the standard designation, from Barthel (1958). Fischer (1997) refers to it as RR9.

== Location ==
Museo Nacional de Historia Natural, Santiago. Catalog # 5.498 (315).

There are reproductions at the Musée de l'Homme, Paris; Institut für Völkerkunde, Tübingen (prior to 1989); Bishop Museum, Honolulu; American Museum of Natural History, New York; van Hoorebeeck Collection, Belgium; and in Steven Fischer's collection in Auckland.

== Description ==
Traditional fire-making is a likely cause of the gouge on the recto.

A fluted, delicately carved but fire-damaged tablet, 44.5 × 11.6 × 2.7 cm, of Pacific rosewood (Orliac 2005). The wood is bent, following the contours of the tree from which it was cut. The sides are beveled, perhaps to make a larger writing surface.

A plugged hole at the top (recto) may have been used for hanging. On the left side of the recto, lines 8-12 have been burnt out; the damage continues onto the verso, taking out part of lines 1-2. There is a 10-cm gouge along the right of recto line 6 which Orliac (2003/2004:48-53) concluded was made by a fire stick in the making of a fire (image at right).

Imbelloni (1951:99) was of the opinion that,

This tablet is one of the most finely incised among all those that one knows; each one of its figures has a harmoniously drawn contour; the incision is not deep, nor reveals itself on the surface by a furrow that is wide, but narrow, thread-like. (translation by Fischer)

== Provenance ==
In 1870 Father Roussel gave tablets G and H to Captain Gana of the Chilean corvette O'Higgins. They remained in the custody of the Chilean navy in Valparaíso until they were sent to the newly established department of archeology at the Museo Nacional de Historia Natural.

== Contents ==
The Large Santiago tablet holds a long 'chant cycle' (to use Fischer's words), versions of which is also found on the large and small St Petersburg tablets (P and Q). Shorter sequences are shared with other tablets: Hr7 with Aa2, Pr3, and Qr3; Hr2 with Qr2; and Hr4 with Qr4.

== Text ==
There are twelve lines of glyphs on each side, with some 1,580 surviving glyphs out of a pre-fire total of approximately 1,770. The reading order of the parallel texts H, P, and Q is well established.

Barthel

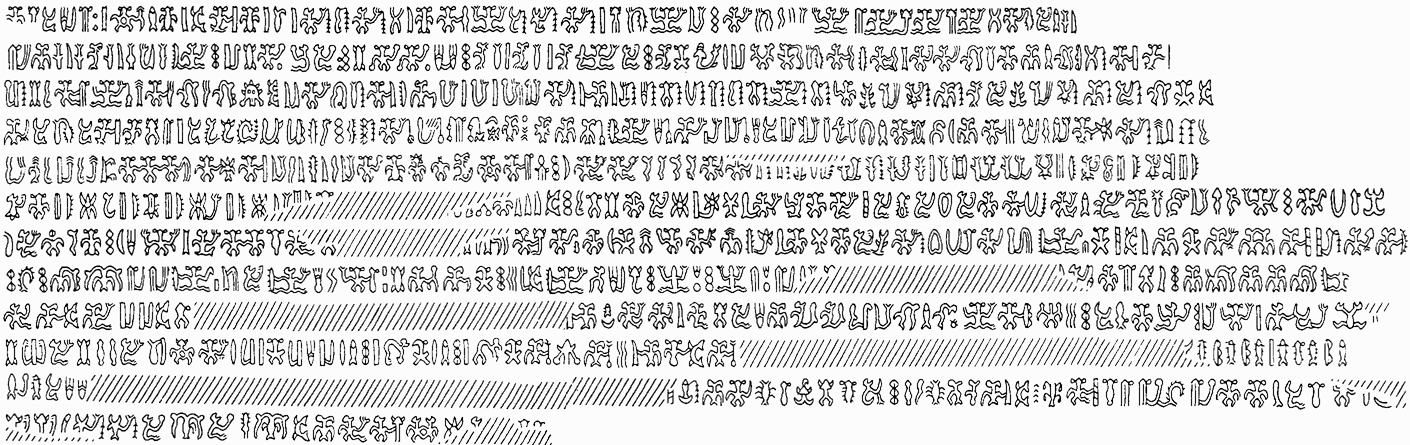
Recto, as traced by Barthel. The lines have been rearranged to reflect English reading order: Hr1 at top, Hr12 at bottom.
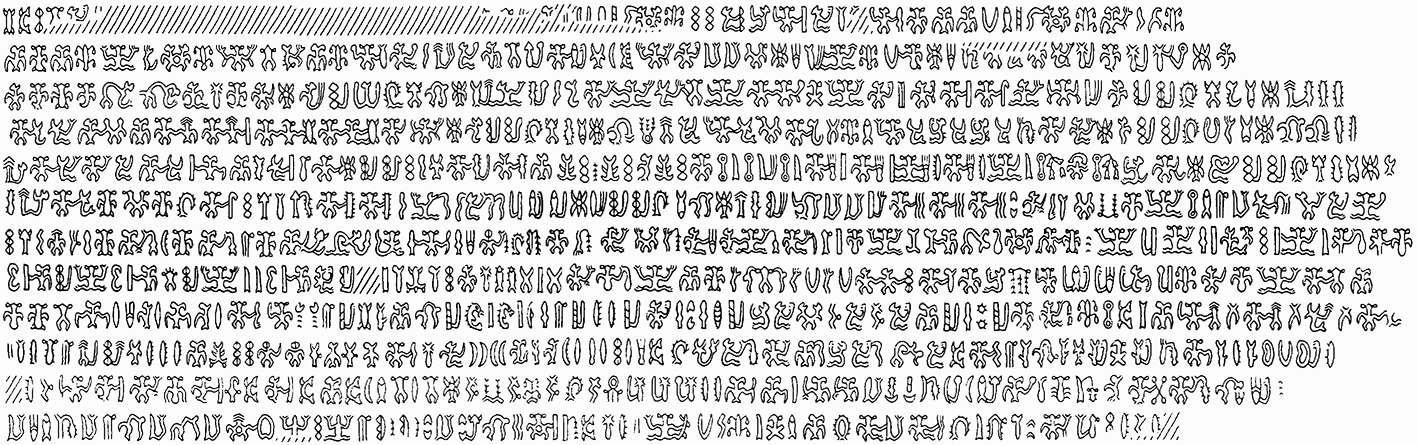
Verso, as traced by Barthel: Hv1 at top, Hv12 at bottom.

Fischer

== Image gallery ==
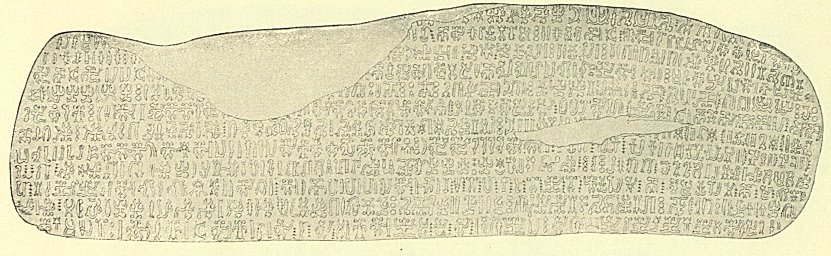
Recto, engraving

Recto, color, showing fire damage. The text begins upside-down in this view.

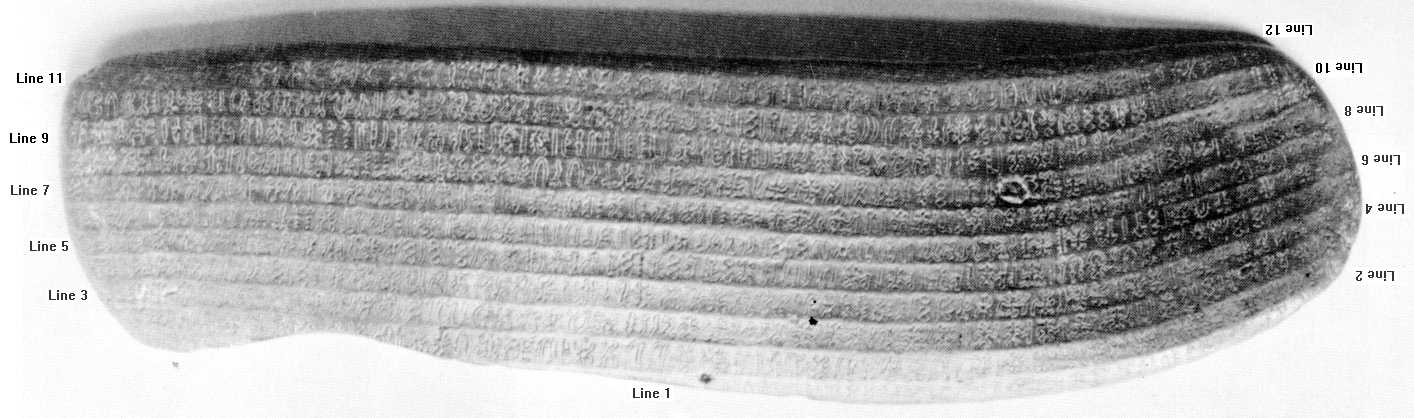
Verso, glyphs traced

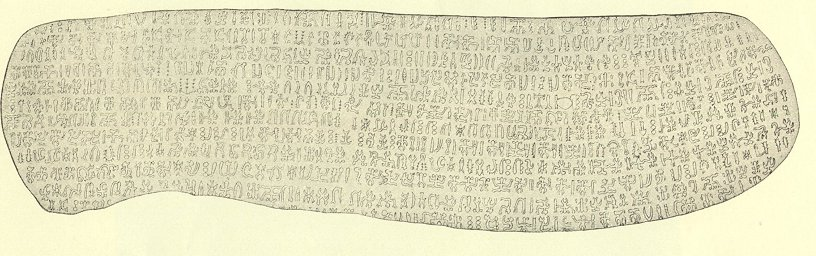
Verso, engraving
