= Toromiro =

Toromiro may refer to the plants:

- Sophora toromiro, a legume tree endemic to Easter Island
- Pectinopitys ferruginea, a conifer endemic to New Zealand
