= Correa (surname) =

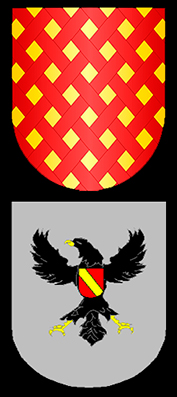
Correa or Currea

Correa is a Spanish surname. Correa is found throughout the Iberian Peninsula. Correa means 'leather strap', 'belt', 'rein', 'shoelace', plural correas. Correa is from the Latin corrigia 'fastening', from corrigere 'to straighten', 'to correct'), applied as a metonymic occupational name for a maker or seller of such articles. Correa is spelt Correia in Portuguese and Galician.

== Arts ==
- Arleene Correa Valencia (born 1993), Mexican-born embroidery and textile artist
- Aurora Correa (1930–2008), Spanish-Mexican teacher and writer
- Caroline Correa (born 1979), Brazilian actress
- Chamin Correa (1929–2020), Mexican guitarist
- Dolores Correa Zapata (1853–1924), Mexican teacher, writer, poet, and advocate for women's rights
- Drew Correa (born 1984), American music producer
- Enrique Gómez Correa (1915–1995), Chilean poet, lawyer and diplomat
- Eric "Bobo" Correa (born 1968), American musician
- Francisco Correa de Arauxo (1584–1654), Spanish organist and composer of the late Renaissance
- Francisco Laguna Correa (born 1982), Mexican writer and editor
- Hugo Correa (1926–2008), Chilean science fiction writer
- Isabella Correa (c. 1655–c. 1700), Dutch poet
- Juan Correa (1646–1716), Mexican painter
- Juan Correa de Vivar (1510–1566), Spanish painter
- Julio Correa (1890–1953), Paraguayan poet
- Mayuto Correa (born 1943), Brazilian percussionist, guitarist and composer
- Tiago Correa (born 1981), Chilean actor

== Politicians ==
- Eric Correa Rivera (born 1975), Puerto Rican politician
- Lou Correa (born 1958), American-Puerto Rican politician
- Marie-Louise Correa (born 1943), Senegalese politician
- Rafael Correa (born 1963), Ecuadorian politician, 43rd President of Ecuador
- Ruth Stella Correa Palacio (born 1959), Colombian politician

== Sportspeople ==
=== Footballers ===
- Alejandro Correa (born 1979), Uruguayan footballer
- Andrés Correa (born 1994), Colombian footballer
- Andrés Felipe Correa (born 1984), Colombian footballer
- Ángel Correa (born 1995), Argentine footballer
- Bernardo Correa (born 1995), Chilean footballer
- Cláudio Correa (born 1993), Paraguayan footballer
- Fernando Correa (born 1974), Uruguayan footballer
- Gabriel Correa (footballer) (born 1968), Uruguayan footballer
- Gary Correa (born 1990), Peruvian footballer
- Jaime Correa (born 1979), Mexican footballer
- Joaquín Correa (born 1994), Argentine footballer
- Jorge Correa (born 1993), Argentine footballer
- José Erick Correa (born 1992), Colombian footballer
- Julio Correa (born 1948), Uruguayan footballer
- Lucas Correa (born 1984), Argentine footballer
- Maximiliano Correa (born 1989), Argentine footballer
- Nicolás Correa (born 1983), Uruguayan footballer
- Pablo Correa (born 1967), Uruguayan football manager and former player
- Rober Correa (born 1992), Spanish footballer
- Rubén Correa (born 1941), Peruvian footballer
- Tomi Correa (born 1984), Spanish footballer
- Vanina Correa (born 1983), Argentine footballer
- Yannel Correa (born 1996), Uruguayan footballer

=== Other sportspeople ===
- Ana Correa (born 1985), Spanish volleyball player
- Carlos Correa (born 1994), Puerto Rican baseball player
- Carmelita Correa (born 1988), Mexican pole vaulter
- Ed Correa (born 1966), Puerto Rican baseball player
- Emilio Correa (born 1953), Cuban boxer, Olympic Gold medalist 1972
- Emilio Correa (born 1985), Cuban boxer, son of E. Correa Sr., PanAm Champion 2007
- Fernando Correa (born 1961), Venezuelan cyclist
- Harold Correa (born 1988), French triple jumper
- Javier Correa (born 1976), Argentine sprint canoeist
- Kai Correa (born 1988), American baseball coach
- Kamalei Correa (born 1994), American football player
- Leilani Correa (born 2001), American basketball player
- Miguel Correa (born 1983), Argentine sprint canoeist

== Other ==
- Antonio de los Reyes Correa (1665–1758), Puerto Rican military officer of Spanish ancestry
- Antonio Correa Cotto (1926–1952), Puerto Rican criminal
- Carolina Correa Londoño (1905–1986), First Lady of Colombia from 1953 to 1957
- Charles Correa (1930–2015), Indian architect
- Gilberto Correa (born 1943), Venezuelan television personality
- Heriberto Correa Yepes (1916–2010), Colombian Roman Catholic bishop
- Jaime Correa (born 1957), Colombian-American urban planner and architect
- Luis Fernando Correa Bahamon (born 1955), Colombian businessman, philanthropist and investor
- Maevia Noemí Correa (1914–2005), Argentine botanist
- Mathias F. Correa (1910–1963), U.S. intelligence pioneer, lawyer and prosecutor
- Mateo Correa Magallanes (1866–1927), often referred to as Father Correa or St. Mateo Correa, a Mexican Martyr
- Mireya Correa (1940–2022), Panamanian botanist
- Raquel Correa (1934–2012), Chilean journalist

== See also ==
- Correa (disambiguation)
- Corea, an alternate spelling
- Correia or Corrêa, its Portuguese and Galician equivalent
