= Korea (disambiguation) =

Korea is a region in East Asia.

Korea may also refer to:

- North Korea, officially the Democratic People's Republic of Korea
- South Korea, officially the Republic of Korea

== Places ==
=== Historical ===
- Goguryeo or Koguryŏ, an ancient Korean kingdom whose name changed to Koryŏ in the 5th century; "Korea" comes from "Koguryŏ" (37 BC–668 AD)
- Goryeo or Koryŏ, a medieval Korean kingdom (918–1392)
- Joseon (1392–1897)
- The Proto–Three Kingdoms period
- The Three Kingdoms period
- The Later Three Kingdoms period
- The Korean Empire (1897–1910)
- The People's Republic of Korea (1945–1946)

=== Geographical ===
- Korea, Więcbork, neighbourhood of Więcbork, Kuyavian-Pomeranian Voivodeship, north-central Poland
- Korea, Chełmno County, part of Grzybno, Kuyavian-Pomeranian Voivodeship, north-central Poland
- Korea, Gmina Telatyn, Lublin Voivodeship, south-eastern Poland
- Korea, Gmina Ulhówek, Lublin Voivodeship, south-eastern Poland
- Korea, Piotrków County, part of Kosów, Łódź Voivodeship, central Poland
- Korea, Wieluń County, an administrative settlement in Mokrsko
- Korea, Otwock County, part of Sobienie Szlacheckie, Masovian Voivodeship, east-central Poland
- Korea District, Chhattisgarh, India
- Korea State, India
- Korea, Kentucky, United States
- Korea, Virginia, United States

== Films ==
- Korea (1952 film), a lost Philippine film
- Korea (1995 film), an Irish film directed by Cathal Black
- As One (film), also known as Korea, 2012 South Korean film

== Music ==
- The Korea, a Russian metal band, previously known as "Korea".
- "Korea", a song by Leslie Mándoki and Éva Csepregi, 1987, performed live at the 1988 Summer Olympics opening ceremony
- "Korea", a song by Deftones from White Pony, 2000
- "Korea", a song by Kim Petras from Detour, 2026

== Books ==
- Korea: Tradition and Transformation—A History of the Korean People, 1988 book

== See also ==
- Korean (disambiguation), anything of, from, or related to the nations in the Korean peninsula
- Names of Korea
- Chorea (disambiguation)
- Corea (disambiguation), an alternate spelling of Korea, in many languages other than English, also an alternate spelling of the surname Correa
- Correa (disambiguation)
- Correia, a Portuguese surname
