= Janani =

Janani may refer to:

== Film ==
- Janani (1984 film), an Ollywood film of 1984
- Janani (1985 film), an Indian Tamil-language film
- Janani (1993 film), an Indian Bengali-language film
- Janani (1999 film), an Indian Malayalam-language film
- Janani (2006 film), an Indian Hindi-language film
- Janani (2010 film), an Indian Kannada-language film

== Television ==
- Janani (TV series), a 2022–present Indian Kannada-language drama series
- Janani – AI Ki Kahani, a 2024 Indian Hindi-language sci-fi series

== People ==
- Janani (actress), Indian actress
- Janani Ashok Kumar, Indian television actress in Sembaruthi
- Janani Bharadwaj (born 1989), Indian playback singer
- Janani Cooray, Sri Lankan performance artist
- Janani Jananayagam or Jan Jananayagam, British Tamil banker, activist, and politician
- Janani Luwum (1922–1977), Archbishop of the Church of Uganda
- Narayanan Janani (born 1985), Indian cricket umpire
