= Chorea (disambiguation) =

Chorea is an abnormal involuntary movement disorder.

Chorea or Choreia may also refer to:

- Choreia, an ancient Greek dance
- Chorea minor
- Chorea gravidarum, a chorea that occurs as a complication in pregnancy

== See also ==
- Choreoathetosis, a combination of chorea and athetosis
- Cholera, an infection of the small intestine by some strains of the bacterium Vibrio cholerae
- Corea (disambiguation)
- Correa (disambiguation)
- Correia, a Portuguese surname
- Korea (disambiguation)
