= Corea (surname) =

Corea (Sinhala: කොරයා, romanized: Korayā) is a surname. Notable people with the surname include:

== In Sri Lanka ==
- Charles Alfred Ernest Corea, Sri Lankan lawyer
- Charles Edgar Corea, Sri Lankan politician, President of the Ceylon National Congress (1924)
- Claude Corea, Sri Lankan politician/diplomat, High Commissioner to the UK and Ambassador to the United States
- Dominicus Corea, (Sinhalese name Edirille Rala), 16th Century ruler
- Ernest Corea, Sri Lankan journalist and Ambassador to the United States
- Gamani Corea, Sri Lankan economist, Secretary-General of UNCTAD
- Gate Mudaliyar James Edward Corea, Sri Lankan public official in Colonial Ceylon
- Harindra Corea, Sri Lankan politician, Deputy Foreign Minister
- Ishvari Corea (1925–2019), Sri Lankan librarian
- Ivan Corea, Sri Lankan clergyman of the Church of Ceylon
- J.C.A. Corea, first Sri Lankan principal of Royal College Colombo
- James Alfred Ernest Corea, Sri Lankan physician
- Mayadunne Corea, Sri Lankan judge of the Court of Appeal
- Srikuradas Charles Shirley Corea, Sri Lankan politician, Speaker of the Parliament of Ceylon
- Vernon Corea Sri Lankan/British radio broadcaster
- Victor Corea, Sri Lankan politician and freedom fighter
- Vijaya Corea, Sri Lankan radio and TV broadcaster

== Others ==
- António Corea, 17th century Korean slave in Italy, given "Corea" as his European surname
- Chick Corea, American jazz pianist
- Nicholas J. Corea, American author

== See also ==
- Corea (disambiguation)
- Corea family
- Cooray
