= Korea, Piotrków County =

Settlement in Poland

Korea
- Settlement
- Location within Poland
- Coordinates: 51°29′41″N 19°40′43″E
- Country: Poland
- Voivodeship: Łódź
- County: Piotrków
- Gmina: Moszczenica
- Village: Kosów
- Time zone: UTC+1 (CET)
  - Summer (DST): UTC+2 (CEST)
- Postal code: 97-310
- Vehicle registration: EPI
- SIMC: 0546590

Korea [kɔˈrɛa] is a settlement, part of the village of Kosów in the administrative district of Gmina Moszczenica, within Piotrków County, Łódź Voivodeship, in central Poland.
