= Correia =

Correia (Portuguese and Galician for "leather strap" from Latin corrigia (leather belt, gird, harness)) is a surname of Portuguese and Galician origin, also spelled Corrêa. The Spanish variant became Correa. Correia and Correa and Correya are found throughout all of the Iberian Peninsula.

It may refer to:

== People ==
=== General ===
==== Portuguese ====
- Correia family, a Portuguese noble family
- Paio Peres Correia, Grand-Master of the military Order of Santiago
- Francisco Correia de Heredia, 1st Viscount of Ribeira Brava, a Portuguese noble, political and a paternal great-great grandfather of H.R.H. Isabel, The Duchess of Braganza
- Berto Correia de Sousa, bank manager
- Adriano Correia de Oliveira, musician
- António Correia (disambiguation)
- Fausto Correia, politician
- Hélia Correia, writer
- João Maria Correia Ayres de Campos, 1st Count of Ameal, politician, art collector, maecenas and humanist
- José Correia da Serra, known as Abbé Correa, philosopher, diplomat, statesman, politician and scientist
- José Homem Correia Teles, jurist, judge and politician
- Nãnci Correia, singer
- Manuel Correia, Baroque composer
- Manuel Pio Correia, botanist
- Natália Correia, writer
- Pedro Correia Garção, lyric poet
- Raúl Correia, footballer
- Telmo Correia, politician

==== Other nationalities ====
- Aurelia Correia, African businesswoman
- Carlos Correia, Guinea-Bissau politician and former Prime Minister
- Ivete da Graça Correia, São Toméan civil servant and politician
- Jasiel Correia, American politician
- Larry Correia, US science fiction writer
- Mário Barreto Corrêa Lima, Brazilian physician and co-founder of UNIMED
- Nicola Correia-Damude, Canadian actress
- Paulo Correia (politician), Guinea-Bissau politician and former Vice President
- Plinio Corrêa de Oliveira, Brazilian historian, politician and Catholic activist
- Sonia Corrêa, Brazilian feminist activist and researcher
- Veríssimo Correia Seabra, Guinea-Bissau politician and military
- Silvestra Agnes Correia, Hong Kong early childhood educator
- Joanne Rose Correia-swinton, American licensed, certified Optician and Fine Artist.

=== Sports ===
==== Brazilian football players ====
- Adriano Correia, known as Adriano
- Haílton Corrêa de Arruda, known as Manga
- Carlos Rodrigues Corrêa, known as Corrêa
- Christian Corrêa Dionisio, known as Christian
- Diego Pereira Corrêa, known as Diego
- Kléber de Carvalho Corrêa, known as Kléber
- Maicon dos Santos Corrêa, known as Maicon Santos
- Marcos Corrêa dos Santos, known as Marquinhos
- Nilson Corrêa Júnior, known as Nilson
- Rodrigo Corrêa Dantas, known as Rodrigo Dantas
- Rogério de Albuquerque Corrêa, known as Rogério Corrêa
- Rogério Corrêa de Oliveira, known as Rogério Corrêa
- Thiago Corrêa
- Wagner Corrêa Machado, known as Wagner

==== Other nationalities football players ====
- André Correia (footballer), Portuguese
- Carlos Alberto Correia, Portuguese
- Marcel Correia, Portuguese-German
- Pedro Guerreiro de Jesus Correia, Portuguese
- Pedro das Neves Correia, Portuguese
- Rui Correia, Portuguese
- Victor Correia, Guinean

==== Other sports ====
- Bethe Correia, Brazilian mixed martial artist
- João Correia, Portuguese rugby union player
- Kevin Correia, United States baseball player
- Luciano Corrêa, Brazilian judoka
- Luizão Corrêa, Brazilian beach volleyball player
- Maritza Correia, Puerto Rican swimmer
- Pierre Corréia, French rugby union player
- Rod Correia, United States baseball player

== Other ==
- Sampaio Corrêa Futebol Clube, Brazilian football club

== See also ==
- Corea, an alternative spelling
- Correa, its Spanish equivalent
- Correya, an alternative spelling in Anglo Indian version
