= Cooray =

Cooray කුරේ
- Pronunciation: Kurē
- Language: Sinhala

Origin
- Region of origin: Sri Lanka

Other names
- See also: Corea

Cooray (Sinhala: කුරේ, romanized: Kurē) is a Sinhalese surname. Notable people with the surname include:

- Anuradha Cooray (born 1978), Sri Lankan runner
- Asantha Cooray (born 1973), Sri Lankan academic
- B. C. Cooray (born 1941), Sri Lankan cricket official
- Chamil Cooray, Sri Lankan carrom player
- Cissy Cooray (1889–1965), Ceylonese social worker
- Dilhan Cooray (born 1987), Sri Lankan cricketer
- E. J. Cooray, Ceylonese politician
- Harsha Cooray (born 1983), Sri Lankan cricketer
- James Cooray Smith (born 1978), British writer
- Janani Cooray, Sri Lankan performance artist
- Malith Cooray (born 1990), Sri Lankan cricketer
- Nilantha Cooray (born 1978), Sri Lankan cricketer
- P. Andrew Cooray (1901–1998), Ceylonese politician
- Reginald Cooray (1947–2023), Sri Lankan politician
- Sangeeth Cooray (born 1995), Sri Lankan cricketer
- Sirisena Cooray, Sri Lankan politician
- Tennison Cooray (1952–2020), Sri Lankan actor
- Thomas Cooray (1901–1988), Sri Lankan priest
- Vernon Cooray, Swedish scientist
