= Pomyków =

Pomyków may refer to the following villages in Poland:

- Pomyków, Łódź Voivodeship (central Poland)
- Pomyków, Lublin Voivodeship (east Poland)
- Pomyków, Świętokrzyskie Voivodeship (south-central Poland)
- Pomyków, Masovian Voivodeship (east-central Poland)
