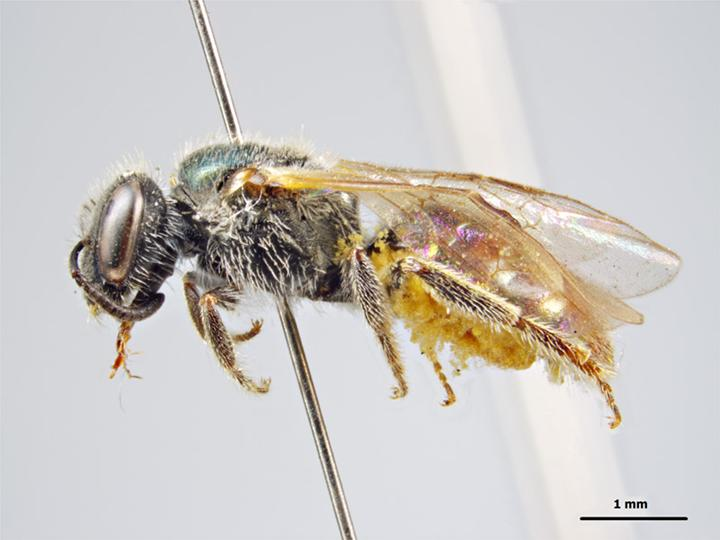
- Female
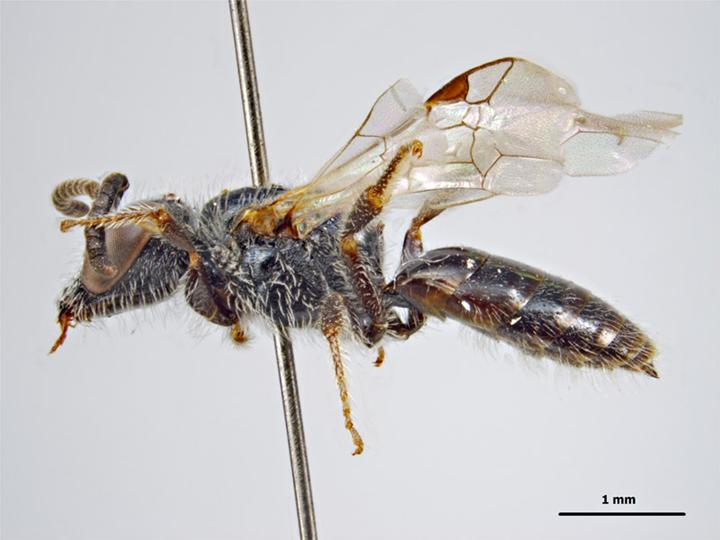
- Male

Scientific classification
- Kingdom: Animalia
- Phylum: Arthropoda
- Clade: Pancrustacea
- Class: Insecta
- Order: Hymenoptera
- Family: Halictidae
- Genus: Lasioglossum
- Species: L. niveifrons

Binomial name
- Lasioglossum niveifrons (Cockerell, 1914)

Synonyms
- Halictus niveifrons Cockerell, 1914; Halictus oxoniellus Cockerell, 1914; Halictus mesocyaneus Cockerell, 1922; Halictus raymenti Cockerell, 1926; Halictus tarltoni Cockerell, 1927; Halictus aureoazureus Rayment, 1935; Halictus littoralis Rayment, 1935

= Lasioglossum niveifrons =

Species of bee

Lasioglossum niveifrons, or Lasioglossum (Homalictus) niveifrons, is a species of bee in the family Halictidae and subfamily Halictinae. It is endemic to Australia. It was described by British-American entomologist Theodore Dru Alison Cockerell in 1914.

== Description ==
Male body length is about 4.75 mm. Integumental colouration is mainly black. The hair is white.

== Distribution and habitat ==
The species occurs in south-eastern Australia. Type localities include Bribie Island in south-east Queensland, as well as Sandringham and Brighton, Victoria.

== Behaviour ==
The adults are flying mellivores. They nest gregariously in soil and have sedentary larvae. Flowering plants visited by the bees include Acacia, Arctotheca, Banksia, Boronia, Carpobrotus, Correa, Epacris, Eucalyptus, Goodenia, Hibbertia, Hypochaeris, Leucopogon, Lobelia, Melaleuca, Mesembryanthemum, Olearia, Osteospermum, Pomaderris, Salpichroa, Sprengelia, Tetragonia, Tetratheca and Veronica species.
