= Isaac Cardoso =

Jewish physician, philosopher, and polemic writer

Isaac Cardoso (born Fernando Cardoso; 1604–1683) was a Portuguese-born Sephardic Jewish physician, philosopher and polemic writer based in Verona.

== Life ==
He was born of Marrano parents at Trancoso, near Celorico, in the province of Beira, Portugal in 1603 or 1604 and died at Verona in 1683. He was an older brother of Abraham Miguel Cardoso.

After studying medicine, philosophy, and natural sciences at Salamanca, he settled as physician at Valladolid in 1632, and was soon called as chief physician (physico mor) to Madrid. While there he published in 1632 a lecture on Vesuvius and on the causes of the earthquake, and in 1635 a treatise on the color green, which he dedicated to Isabel Henriques, who was celebrated in the academies of Madrid for her intellect, and who lived later in Amsterdam. In the latter year he also composed a funeral discourse for Lope de Vega, which was dedicated to the Duke de Sessa, and a treatise on the uses of cold water, printed in 1637, and dedicated to King Philip IV of Spain.

Fernando (his Marrano name) left Spain, probably to escape from the Inquisition, and went with his brother Miguel, who had also studied medicine, to Venice, where both openly embraced Judaism, Fernando changing his name to "Isaac." After a short stay in Venice he settled in Verona, where he remained until his death.

== Works ==
Aside from the works already mentioned, Cardoso published a comprehensive treatise on cosmogony, physics, medicine, philosophy, theology, and natural sciences, printed at Venice in 1673 under the title Philosophia Libera in Septem Libros Distributa, and dedicated to the doge and senate of that city. In this work, which critically discusses the various philosophical systems, he appears as a decided opponent of the Kabbalah and of the pseudo-Messiah Sabbatai Zevi, of whom his brother Miguel was an adherent. Isaac also ridiculed the kabbalistic, Pythagorean doctrine of the transmigration of souls.

This "learned, God-fearing physician," as he is designated by the pious Moses Hagiz (Mishnat Chakamim, p. 120a) defended his coreligionists in his great work, Las Excelencias y Calunias de los Hebreos, printed in 1679 at Amsterdam, and dedicated March 17, 1678, to Jacob de Pinto. In ten chapters he emphasizes the "excelencias" (distinguishing features) of the Jews, their selection by God, their separation from all other peoples by special laws, their compassion for the sufferings of others, their philanthropy, chastity, faith, etc.; and in ten other chapters he refutes the "calunias" (calumnies) brought against them; viz., that they worship false gods, smell badly, are hard and unfeeling toward other peoples, have corrupted Scripture, blaspheme holy images and the host, kill Christian children and use the blood for ritual purposes. This work, which was celebrated by the rabbi J. Brieli of Mantua in a Hebrew sonnet ("Otzar Nechmad," iii. 167), was sent by Cardoso soon after its appearance, July 23, 1679, to the rabbi Samuel Aboab in Venice, asking for an opinion. Aboab answered July 31, thanking him for the splendid gift. In another letter to Aboab, December 24, 1679, he gave his views on the derivation of some Spanish words from persons mentioned in the Bible. According to his contemporary Daniel Levi de Barrios, Cardoso also published Varias Poesias (Sundry Poems, 1680).

Cardoso claims that philosophy and science have a Jewish origin, and that Joseph educated the Egyptians.

== Bibliography ==
- Yerushalmi, Yosef Hayim, From Spanish Court to Italian Ghetto: Isaac Cardoso: a Study in Seventeenth-Century Marranism and Jewish Apologetics. Seattle: University of Washington Press, 1981. ISBN 0-295-95824-3
