= Raciborowice =

Raciborowice may refer to the following places:

- Raciborowice, Lesser Poland Voivodeship (south Poland)
- Raciborowice, Łódź Voivodeship (central Poland)
- Raciborowice, Lublin Voivodeship (east Poland)
