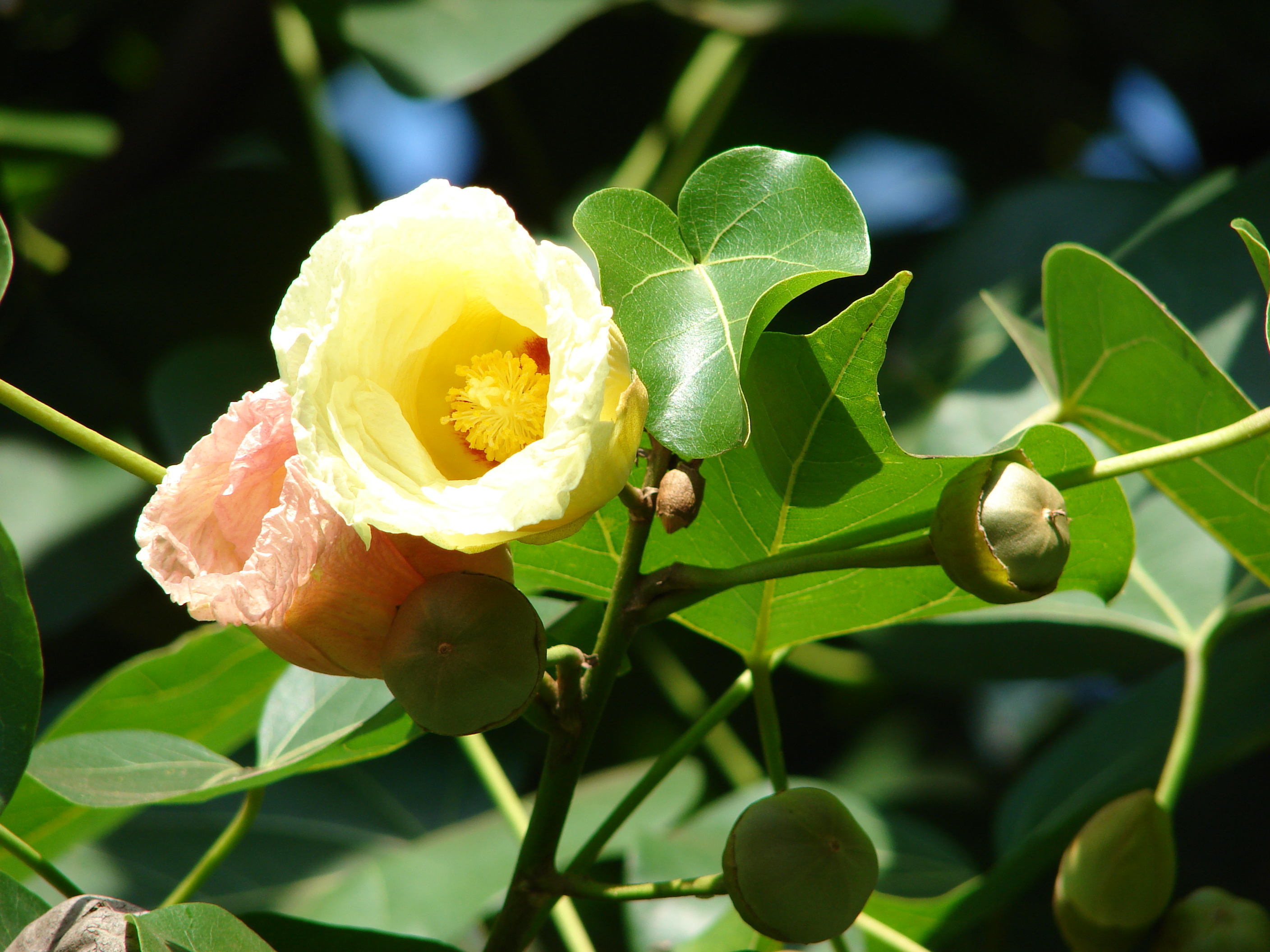

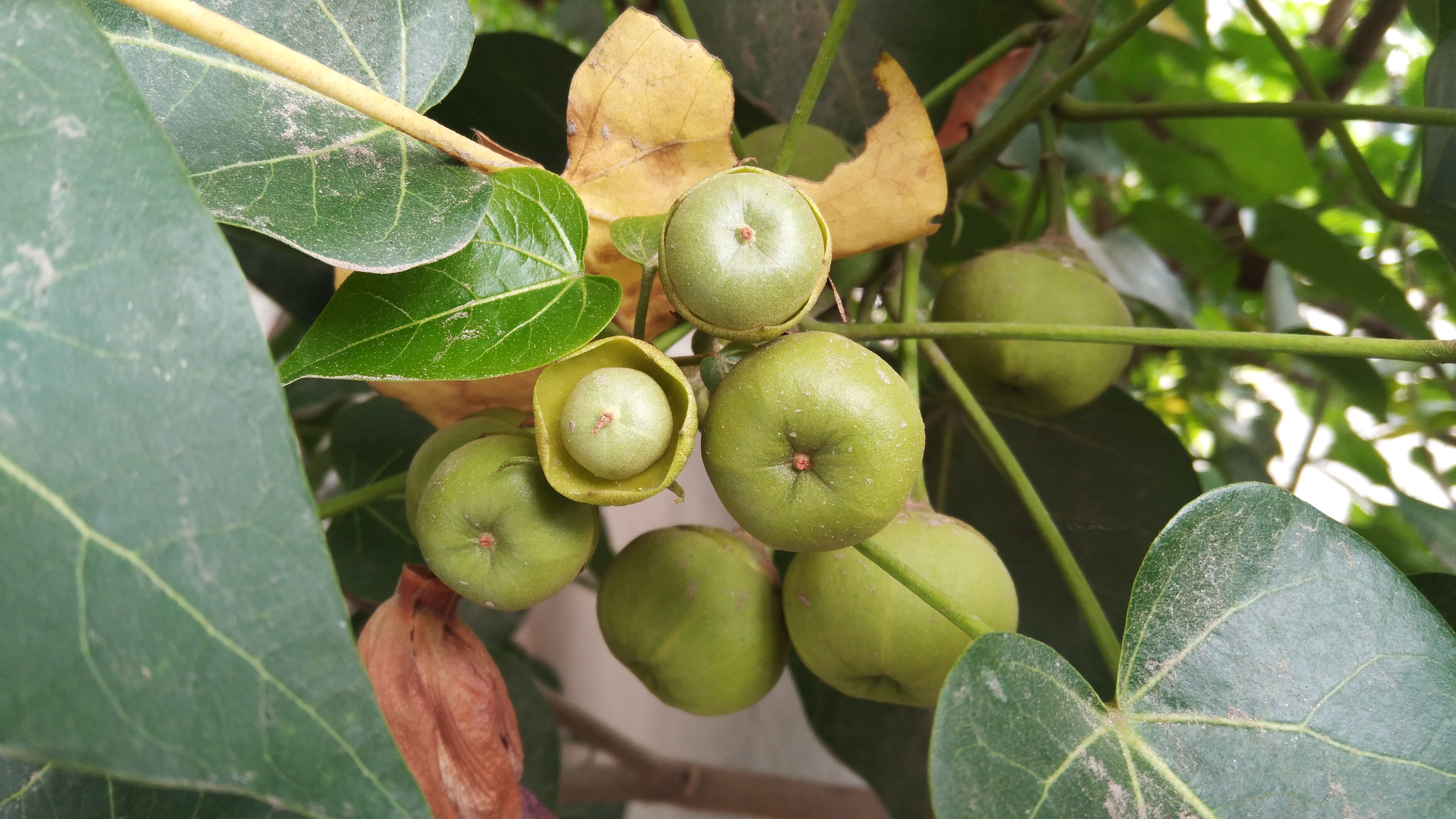

Conservation status
- Least Concern (IUCN 3.1)

Scientific classification
- Kingdom: Plantae
- Clade: Tracheophytes
- Clade: Angiosperms
- Clade: Eudicots
- Clade: Rosids
- Order: Malvales
- Family: Malvaceae
- Genus: Thespesia
- Species: T. populnea

Binomial name
- Thespesia populnea (L.) Sol. ex Corrêa

Synonyms
- Abelmoschus acuminatus (Alef.) Müll.Berol; Azanza acuminata Alef.; Bupariti populnea (L.) Rothm.; Hibiscus bacciferus Blume; Hibiscus blumei Kuntze; Hibiscus litoreus J.Presl; Hibiscus populifolius Salisb. [Illegitimate]; Hibiscus populneoides Roxb.; Hibiscus populneus L.; Malvaviscus populneus (L.) Gaertn.; Parita populnea (L.) Scop.; Thespesia howii S.Y. Hu; Thespesia macrophylla Blume

= Thespesia populnea =

Portia tree

Species of flowering plant

Thespesia populnea, commonly known as the portia tree (/ˈpɔːrʃə/), Pacific rosewood, Indian tulip tree, or milo, among other names, is a species of flowering plant belonging to the mallow family, Malvaceae. It is a tree found commonly on coasts around the world. Although it is confirmed to be native only to the Old World tropics, other authorities consider it to have a wider, possibly pantropical native distribution. It is thought to be an invasive species in Florida and Brazil.

== Description ==
The Portia tree reaches a height of 6–10 m (20–33 ft) tall and its trunk can measure up to 20–30 cm (7 3/4–11 3/4 in) in diameter. The pollen grains are approximately 70 microns in diameter.

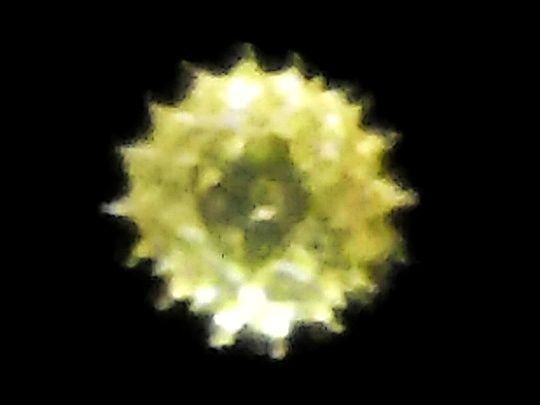
Pollen under a light microscope

== Distribution and habitat ==
Thespesia populnea is native to tropical coastlines and is adapted for oceanic dispersal and growth in island environments. It is known from both coasts of Africa, tropical Asia, northern Australia, the Pacific Islands (including Hawaii), the tropical Pacific coast of the Americas from Mexico south to Colombia, the West Indies, and Florida in the United States. Its exact native distribution has been debated, with most authorities considering it to be native only to the Old World tropics, some others such as Plants of the World Online including the Pacific Islands in its native range, and others such as the IUCN Red List and the USDA also including the tropical Americas within its native range. The IUCN only considers T. populnea to be introduced and invasive in Florida. It may also be invasive in northern Brazil.

Like the related Hibiscus tiliaceus, it was one of the main sources of bast fibers for the production of cordage and wood for Austronesian outrigger ships and carving. Though the plant seeds can survive for months on sea currents, no remains of T. populnea have been recovered from Polynesia prior to the Austronesian expansion (c. 5,000 BP), thus it is regarded by some authors as a canoe plant, deliberately carried and introduced by Austronesian voyagers in the islands they settled. However, it is still considered questionably indigenous to the Pacific islands, including Hawaii, by many other authorities. In Hawaii, it is classified as a native species and is used in habitat restoration projects for the degraded Hawaiian tropical dry forests alongside the definitively native tree species Dodonaea viscosa and Cordia subcordata.

It grows at elevations from sea level to 275 m (902 ft) in areas that receive 500–1,600 mm (20–63 in) of annual rainfall. The tree is able to grow in the wide range of soil types that may be present in coastal environments, including soils derived from quartz (sand), limestone, and basalt; it favours neutral soils (pH of 6–7.4).

== Uses ==
The heartwood of the Portia tree is dark reddish brown to chocolate brown and has a specific gravity of 0.55 to 0.89.

Portia tree is known as milo or miro in Polynesian languages. It is popular in Hawaii for woodworking (commonly turned into bowls) because of the range of colours expressed (tan, through yellow, to red). The trees were regarded as sacred in Polynesian culture and were commonly planted in marae sites along with trees like Ficus, Fagraea berteroana, Casuarina equisetifolia and Calophyllum inophyllum. Traditionally it was planted in sacred groves and used for religious sculpture throughout eastern Polynesia. In Tahiti, Milo wood is used in the making of the to'ere (slotted wooden drum), used in traditional Tahitian tribal drumming. Makoʻi was used for the rongorongo tablets of Easter Island. Since the advent of aluminium-hulled boats in the 20th century, Pitcairners have made regular trips to Henderson Island to harvest miro wood. Usually they venture to Henderson only once per year, but may make up to three trips if the weather is favourable. Pitcairners carve the wood into curios, from which they derive much of their income.

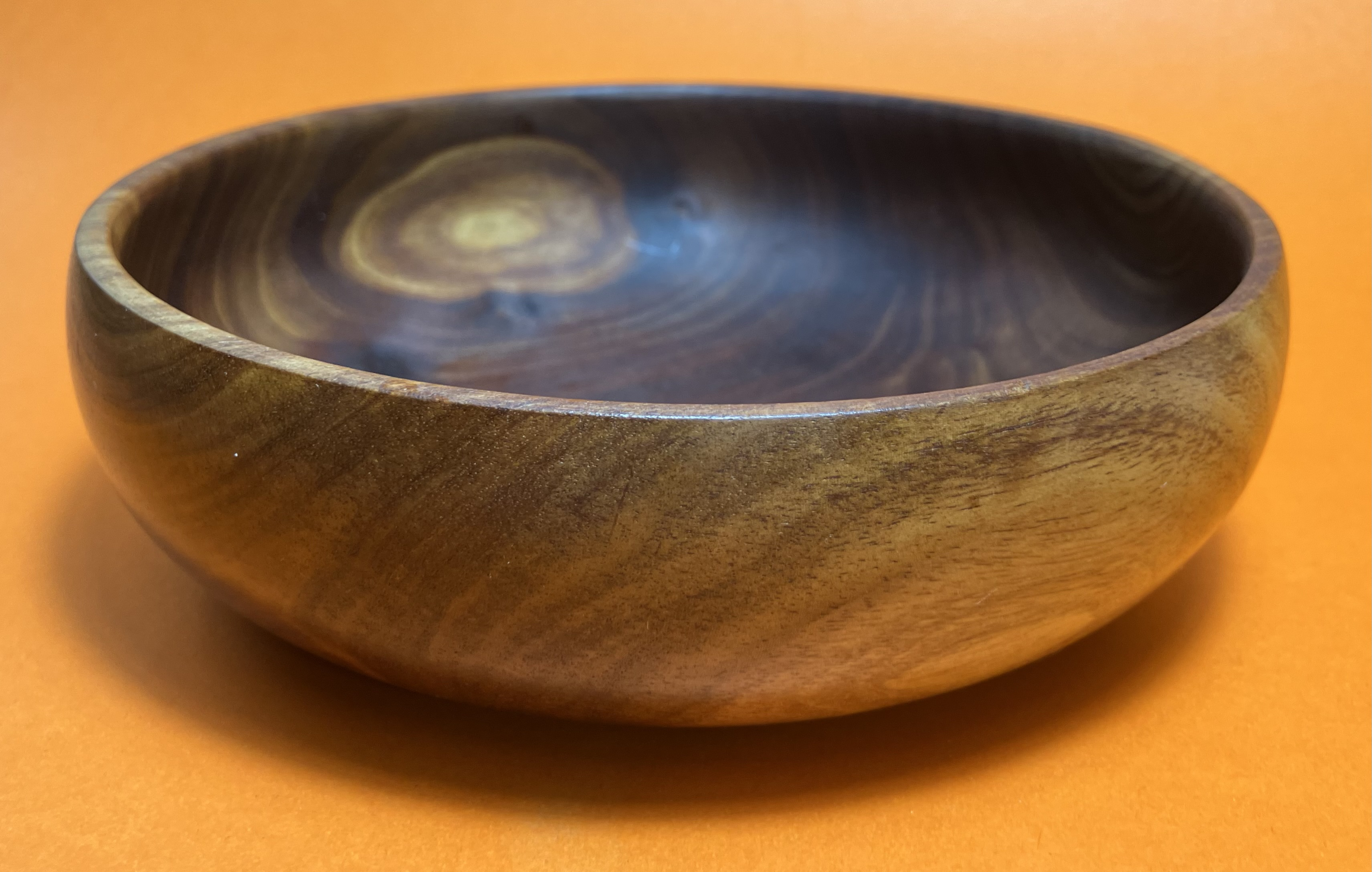
‛Umeke Lū‛au (Hawaiian: "Feast Bowl") hand-turned from Milo by master woodworker William J. Keb (1937–2023), owner of Kama‛aina Woods in Honoka‛a, HI (1976–2014).

In Hawaiʻi, ‛umeke (Hawaiian: "wooden bowl") has been a highly-perfected art form and considered a prized possession for well over a thousand years -- especially those made of Milo and Kou due to the fact that these exotic hardwoods don't impart flavor into food. Prior to 1819, ‛umekes were considered sacred and strictly reserved for ‛Ali‛i (Hawaiian: "Royalty"), and under penalty of death for a commoner to possess one. Today, ‛umekes are highly collectible and have become known as a universal symbol of generosity and welcome.

In New Ireland, Portia wood is used to make hourglass drums. In Tonga, its bark is used to treat mouth infections among infants, and its wood is used to make canoes, house parts, and artwork.

In Indonesia they are known as baru laut, baru pantai or waru lot. The Ambonese cook the leaves into a dish with vegetables.

In South Asia, it is used to make the thavil, a Carnatic musical instrument of South India. The flower of the Portia tree played a part in Sri Lanka's independence movement, when it was sold on Remembrance Day by the Suriya-Mal Movement instead of the poppy to aid Sri Lankan ex-servicemen. The wood from the tree was used by early Tamil people to make instruments in ancient Tamilakam. It can be used for the cellulose production from the plants [Singh et al. 2019].

In some parts of the world, such as Hawaii and southern India, T. populnea is considered an important species in habitat restoration projects for coastal dry forests.

In the Cook Islands, it is utilized in traditional medicine, where remedies from its bark and leaves treat urinary ailments, abdominal swellings, and infant teething pain. Local healers attribute a sexual valence to the fruits based on the split or intact nature of the calyx, and historically, its bruised, charred leaves served as a clinical dressing.

== Gallery ==
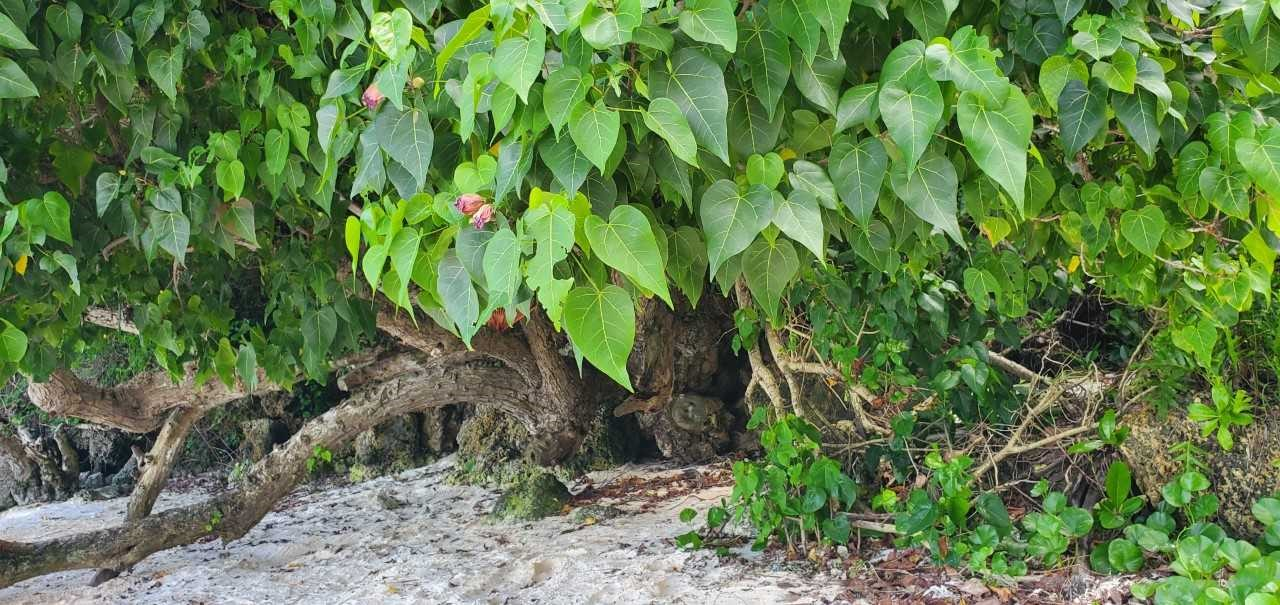
T. populnea (banålu), Tumon beach, Guam

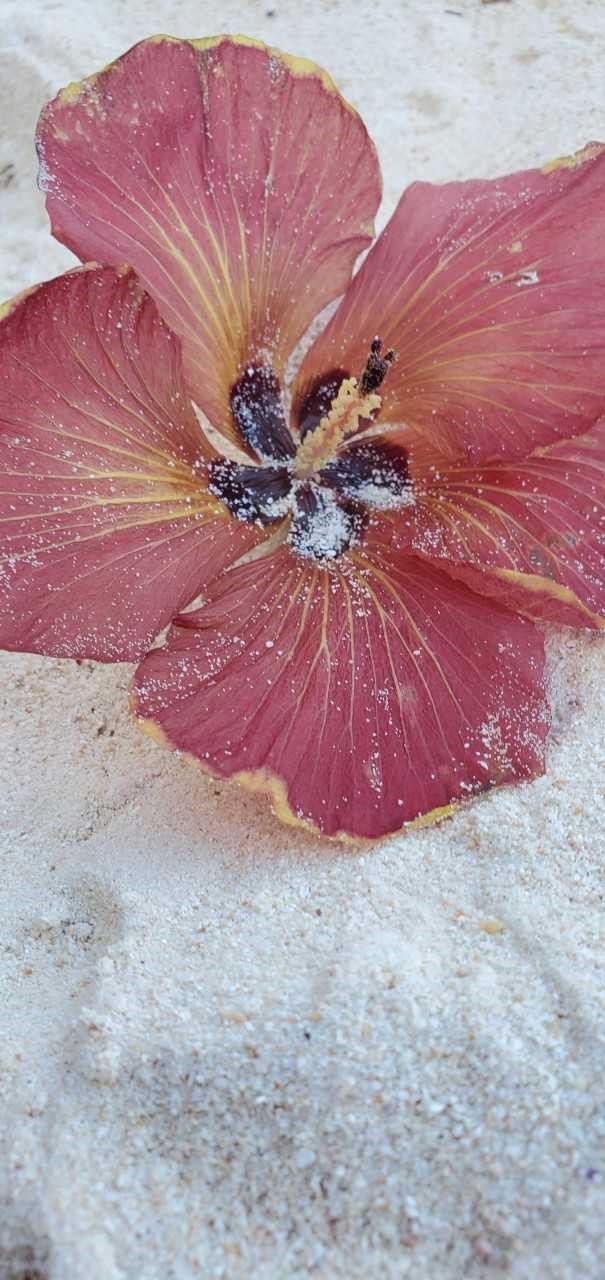
Flower, Tumon beach, Guam

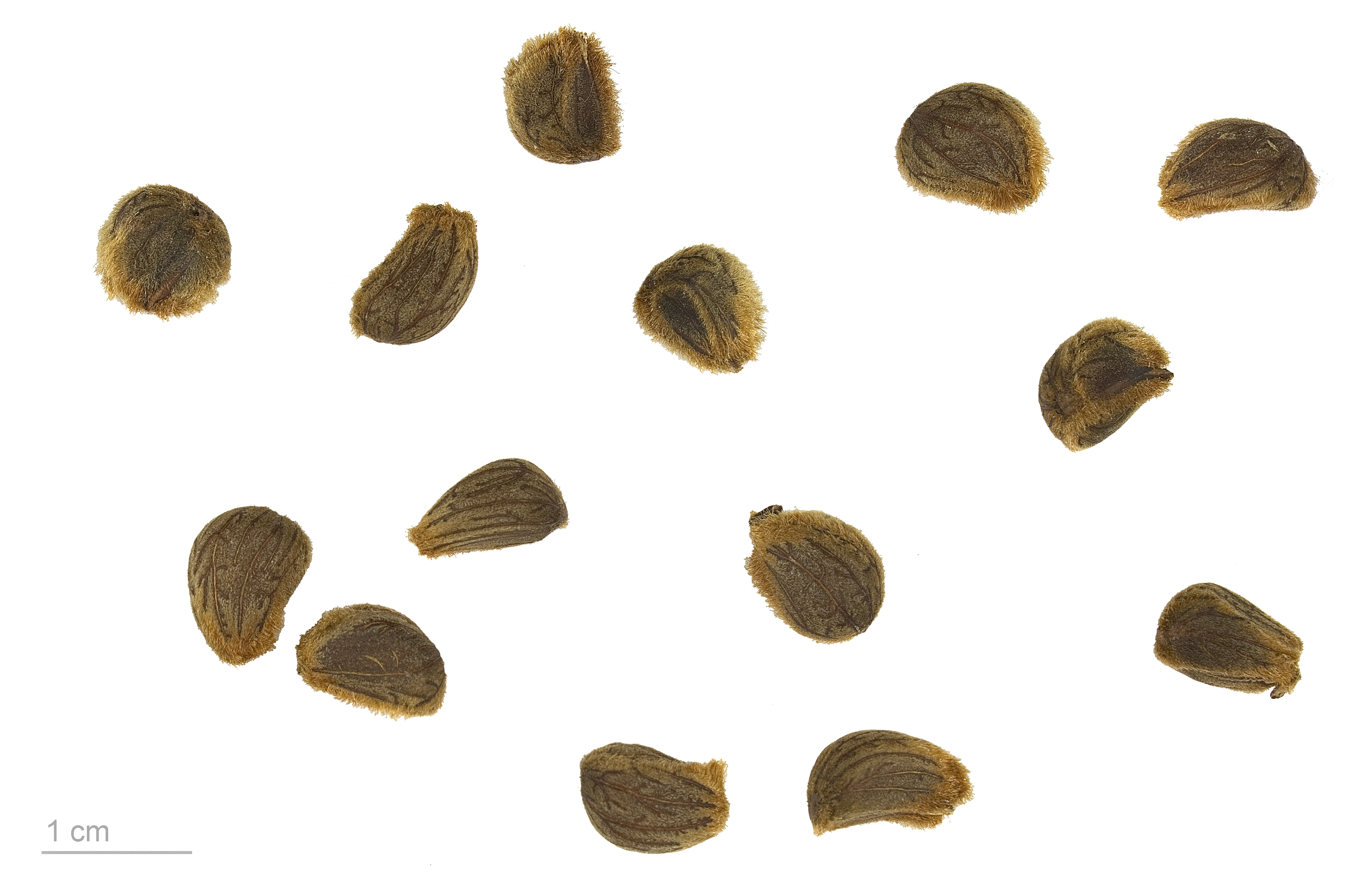
T. populnea seeds

== See also ==
- Domesticated plants and animals of Austronesia
