= 1694 in poetry =

Nationality words link to articles with information on the nation's poetry or literature (for instance, Irish or France).

== Events ==
- Matsuo Bashō completes the writing of Oku no Hosomichi ("Narrow road to the interior").

== Works ==
- Joseph Addison, An Account of the Greatest English Poets
- Edmund Arwaker, An Epistle to Monsieur Boileau, inviting his Muse to forsake the French interest and celebrate the King of England, verse addressed to Nicolas Boileau-Despréaux, reflecting the high esteem the French poet had in England at a time when the French government was considered a dangerous enemy
- Sir Thomas Pope Blount, De Re Poetica; or, Remarks upon Poetry, with Characters and Censures of the most considerable poets, whether Ancient or Modern, Extracted out of the Best and Choicest Critics , an anthology of criticism
- Isabella Correa, translation of Il pastor fido into Spanish
- John Dryden and Jacob Tonson, editors, The Annual Miscellany: for the Year 1694, the fourth in a series published by Tonson from 1684–1709; sometimes referred to as "Dryden's third Miscellany or "Tonson's third Miscellany or just "the third Miscellany; includes Dryden's translation from the original Latin of the third book of Virgil's Georgic
- Charles Gildon, editor, Chorus Poetarum; or, Poems on Several Occasions, an anthology including work by Aphra Behn, the Duke of Buckingham, Sir John Denham, Sir George Etherege and Andrew Marvell
- Charles Hopkins, Epistolary Poems

== Births ==
Death years link to the corresponding "[year] in poetry" article:

- June 20 – Hans Adolph Brorson (died 1764), Danish Pietist bishop and hymnodist
- September 22 – Philip Stanhope, 4th Earl of Chesterfield (died 1773), English statesman and poet
- November 21 – Voltaire, born François-Marie Arouet (died 1778), French Enlightenment writer, poet, essayist and philosopher
- Approximate date – James Bramston (died 1743), English poet

== Deaths ==
Birth years link to the corresponding "[year] in poetry" article:

- November 28 – Matsuo Bashō (born 1644), Japanese Edo period poet

== See also ==
- List of years in poetry
- List of years in literature
- 17th century in poetry
- 17th century in literature
- Poetry
