= 1644 in poetry =

This article covers 1644 in poetry. Nationality words link to articles with information on the nation's poetry or literature (for instance, Irish or France).

== Works published ==
=== Great Britain ===
- John Cleveland, The Character of a London Diurnall, anonymously published
- Francis Quarles:
  - Barnabas and Boanerges: Or, wine and oyle for afflicted soules, Part 2 also published this year in an unauthorized edition as Barnabas and Boanerges; both parts published together under the title Judgement and Mercie for Afflicted Soules 1646
  - The Shepheards Oracle

=== Other ===
- Johann Klaj and Georg Philipp Harsdörffer, Pegnesische Schäfergedicht

== Births ==
Death years link to the corresponding "[year] in poetry" article:

- Matsuo Bashō (died 1694), famous poet of the Edo period in Japan, especially Haiku
- Isaac Chayyim Cantarini (died 1723), Italian poet, writer, physician, rabbi and preacher
- Frances Norton, Lady Norton (died 1731), English poetry religious poet and prose writer

== Deaths ==
Birth years link to the corresponding "[year] in poetry" article:

- Nicholas Bourbon (born 1574), French clergyman and neo-Latin poet
- Peter Hausted (born 1605), playwright, poet, preacher
- Geoffrey Keating (born 1569), Irish Roman Catholic priest, poet and historian
- Rhys Prichard (born 1579), Welsh language poet and a vicar
- Francis Quarles (born 1592), English
- George Sandys (born 1578), English traveller, colonist and poet, the seventh and youngest son of Church of England Archbishop Edwin Sandys
- Luís Vélez de Guevara (born 1579), Spanish dramatist, poet, and novelist

== See also ==
- Poetry
- 17th century in poetry
- 17th century in literature
- Cavalier poets in England, who supported the monarch against the puritans in the English Civil War
