= Corea =

Corea may refer to:

- Korea, the term for the peninsula and its culture composed currently of two sovereign states, for which Corea is a spelling in many languages, especially Romance languages, and a former spelling in English
  - Korean Peninsula, the land area which Korea occupies
  - North Korea, one of the two sovereign states occupying the Korean peninsula
  - South Korea, one of the two sovereign states occupying the Korean peninsula
- Coreae, a place near Wadi al-Far'a (river)

== Other places ==
- A village in the town of Gouldsboro, Maine

== People ==
- Cooray, a surname
- Coorey, a surname
- Corea (surname), a surname

== See also ==
- Korea (disambiguation)
- Names of Korea, the article on the various names for the nation/culture
- Correa (disambiguation) (Spanish word and surname)
- Correia (Portuguese and Galician word and surname)
- Chorea (disambiguation) (A medical term for an involuntary movement disorder)
- Corea (HBC vessel), see Hudson's Bay Company vessels
