= Sierosław, Łódź Voivodeship =

Sierosław
- Village
- Location within Poland
- Coordinates: 51°30′N 19°37′E
- Country: Poland
- Voivodeship: Łódź
- County: Piotrków
- Gmina: Moszczenica

Sierosław [ɕɛˈrɔswaf] is a village in the administrative district of Gmina Moszczenica, within Piotrków County, Łódź Voivodeship, in central Poland.
