= Raków, Łódź Voivodeship =

Raków
- Village
- Location within Poland
- Coordinates: 51°27′N 19°43′E
- Country: Poland
- Voivodeship: Łódź
- County: Piotrków
- Gmina: Moszczenica
- Population (approx.): 200

Raków [ˈrakuf] is a village in the administrative district of Gmina Moszczenica, within Piotrków County, Łódź Voivodeship, in central Poland.

The village has an approximate population of 200.
