= Moszczenica-Osiedle =

- Village
- Location within Poland
- Coordinates: 51°29′28″N 19°42′03″E
- Country: Poland
- Voivodeship: Łódź
- County: Piotrków
- Gmina: Moszczenica

Moszczenica-Osiedle [mɔʂt͡ʂɛˈnit͡sa ɔˈɕɛdlɛ] is a village in the administrative district of Gmina Moszczenica, within Piotrków County, Łódź Voivodeship, in central Poland.
