= Berto Correia de Sousa =

Portuguese banker (born 1972)

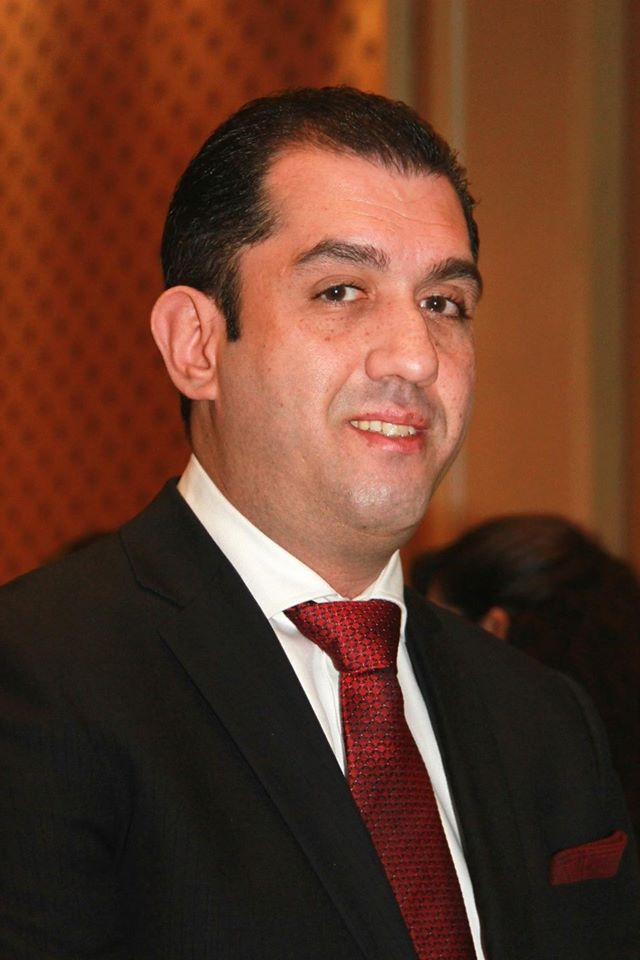
- Full name: Berto Gil Correia Gomes de Sousa
- Born: 16 April 1972 (age 54); Clínica Santa Catarina, São Pedro (Funchal), Portugal
- Father: João Gomes de Sousa
- Mother: Berta de Sousa

Berto Correia de Sousa (born 16 April 1972) is a Portuguese-Swiss bank manager living and working in Zurich, Switzerland, member of two of the most prestigious families of the Portuguese nobility, the House of Correia and the House of Sousa.

== Life ==
Berto Correia de Sousa was born in Funchal, Madeira to João Gomes de Sousa (1941–2023) a Madeiran entrepreneur, owner of Universal Store, from the House of Sousa, being a descendant of D. Egas Gomes de Sousa (1035-?), and his wife, D. Berta Emília (née Correia de Deus) born 1945, Porto.

Berto has one sister Maria (1970-), married with Dr. Duarte Nuno Figueira da Silva de Noronha Jardim (1964-) a neurologist and descendant of count Afonso of Gijón and Noronha (1350-1395), son of king Henry II of Castile and parents of two children Catarina (2002-) and Guilherme de Noronha (2003-).

Berto grew up in Funchal, Solothurn and in Geneva, often spending time in Austria and Germany.

Berto Correia is in direct line descent of D. Soeiro Pais Correia (1150-?), a Portuguese medieval knight and the first Lord of Fralães and the son of Paio Ramiro who was at the service of Henry of Burgundy, Count of Portucale (1095) when his appointment in county government.

D. Soeiro Pais Correia's third grandchild the Friar D. Paio Peres Correia, was the Master of the Order of Santiago having led a military campaign against the Moors in the Algarve, which culminated in the taking of Silves and was crucial to the final conquest of that region in 1249 during the reign of Sancho II.

D. Paio Peres Correia is the ancestor of Saint Nuno of Saint Mary ( Holy Constable Dom Nuno Álvares Pereira ) whose daughter Beatriz Pereira Alvim married D. Afonso the illegitimate son of King João I and of D. Inês Pires Esteves and future Duke of Braganza. This marriage will entail the House of Braganza and become the reigning house of Portugal in 1640 and which will be linked over the centuries until today with the royal houses and Catholic principalities in Europe and Brazil .

Berto Correia from his mother's side is the heir of two branches of the Correia’s family, the Correia de Deus and Pinto Correia lines, the last one in Madeira. One of his ancestors, D. João Afonso Correia was the son of D. Isabel Correia and Gonçalo Annes de Azevedo and was with João Gonçalves Zarco one of the first and principal settlers of Madeira island (1420) and gave rise to Majorats of the Houses of Ajuda, of São Martinho, Count of Torre, viscounts of Casa Branca, etc.

== Education and career ==
Berto Correia de Sousa was educated at Externato Lisbonense and Francisco Franco secondary school in Madeira and after at Hochalpines Institut Ftan boarding school, later at Swiss Finance Institut in Geneva, Switzerland, and holds a Master's degree in European Studies from Lisbon University. He is former employee at Banco Mello. Since 2010 he's the General Director Representative of the Millennium Portuguese Commercial Bank in Switzerland with offices in Geneva, Lausanne and Zurich. Millennium bcp is a Portuguese bank that was founded in 1985 and is the largest private bank in the country.
