= Gazomka =

- Village
- Location within Poland
- Coordinates: 51°28′N 19°45′E
- Country: Poland
- Voivodeship: Łódź
- County: Piotrków
- Gmina: Moszczenica

Gazomka [ɡaˈzɔmka] is a village in the administrative district of Gmina Moszczenica, within Piotrków County, Łódź Voivodeship, in central Poland.
