= Karlin, Łódź Voivodeship =

Karlin
- Village
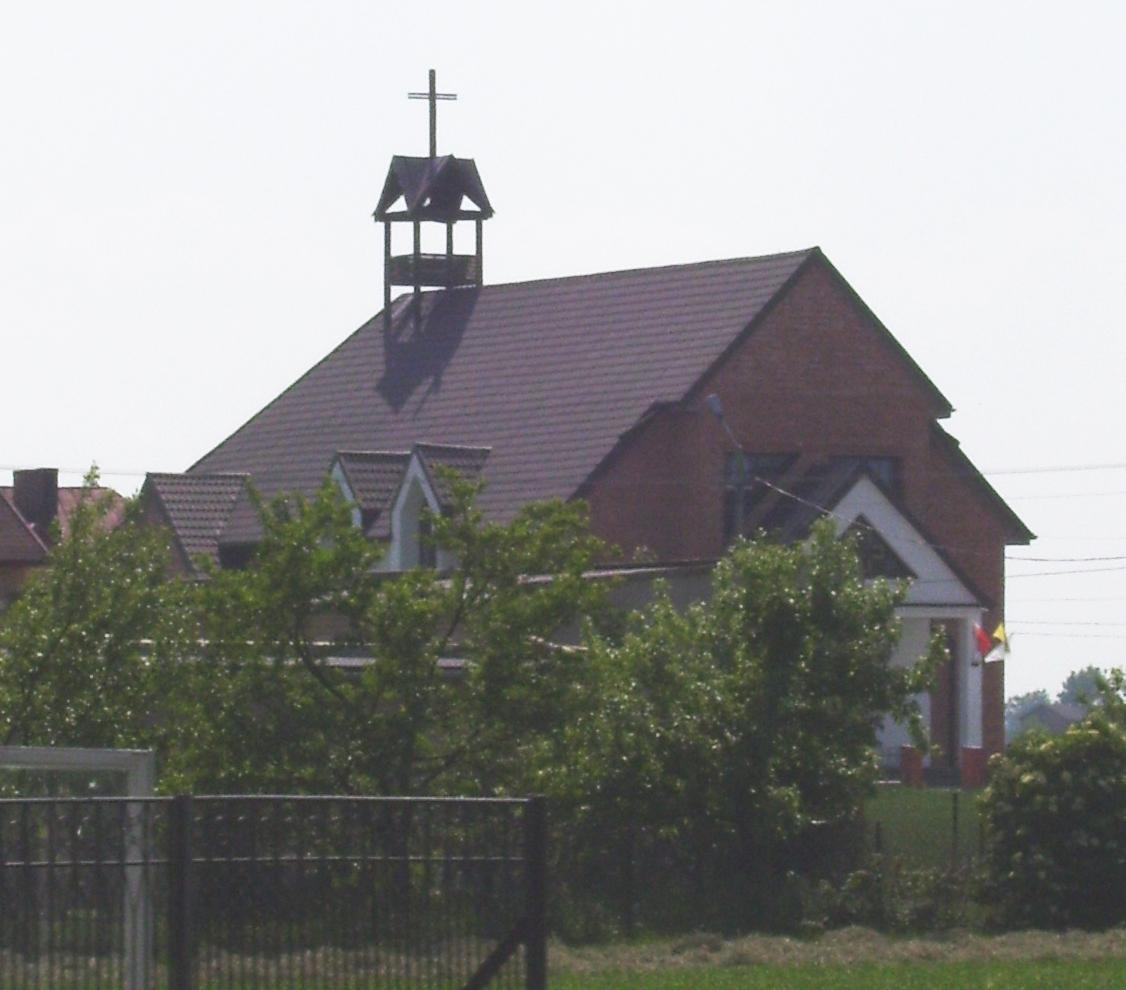
- Church

- Location within Poland
- Coordinates: 51°28′N 19°39′E
- Country: Poland
- Voivodeship: Łódź
- County: Piotrków
- Gmina: Moszczenica

Karlin [ˈkarlin] is a village in the administrative district of Gmina Moszczenica, within Piotrków County, Łódź Voivodeship, in central Poland.
