= Raków Duży =

- Village
- Location within Poland
- Coordinates: 51°27′N 19°43′E
- Country: Poland
- Voivodeship: Łódź
- County: Piotrków
- Gmina: Moszczenica
- Population: 150

Raków Duży [ˈrakuf ˈduʐɨ] is a village that is located in the administrative district of Gmina Moszczenica, within Piotrków County, Łódź Voivodeship, in central Poland.
