= Gościmowice Drugie-Powęziny =

- Village
- Location within Poland
- Coordinates: 51°31′08″N 19°41′47″E
- Country: Poland
- Voivodeship: Łódź
- County: Piotrków
- Gmina: Moszczenica

Gościmowice Drugie-Powęziny (Polish pronunciation: [ɡɔɕt͡ɕimɔˈvit͡sɛ ˈdruɡʲɛ pɔvɛ̃ˈʑinɨ]) is a village in the administrative district of Gmina Moszczenica, within Piotrków County, Łódź Voivodeship, in central Poland.
