= Moszczenica-Wola =

- Village
- Location within Poland
- Coordinates: 51°30′N 19°43′E
- Country: Poland
- Voivodeship: Łódź
- County: Piotrków
- Gmina: Moszczenica

Moszczenica-Wola [mɔʂt͡ʂɛˈnit͡sa ˈvɔla] is a village in the administrative district of Gmina Moszczenica, within Piotrków County, Łódź Voivodeship, in central Poland.
