= Nowa Gazomia =

- Village
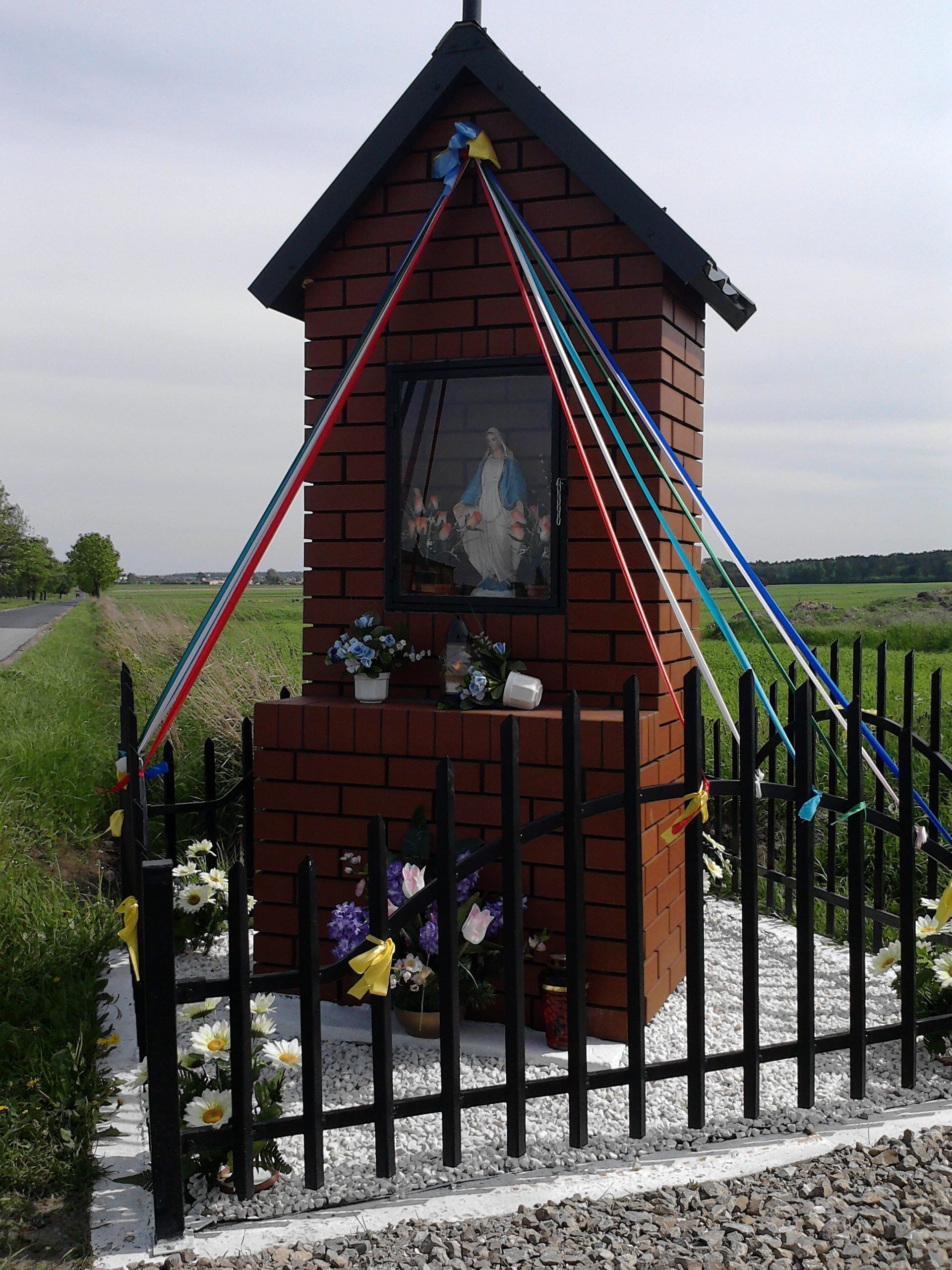
- Wayside shrine in Nowa Gazomia

- Location within Poland
- Coordinates: 51°29′08″N 19°44′42″E
- Country: Poland
- Voivodeship: Łódź
- County: Piotrków
- Gmina: Moszczenica

Nowa Gazomia [ˈnɔva ɡaˈzɔmja] is a village in the administrative district of Gmina Moszczenica, within Piotrków County, Łódź Voivodeship, in central Poland.
