= Isabella Correa =

Dutch Jewish poet

- Born: c. 1655; Lisbon, Kingdom of Portugal
- Died: c. 1700 (aged 44–45); Amsterdam, The Netherlands
- Spouse: Nicolas de Olivier y Fullana
- Writing career
- Language: Spanish
- Genre: Poetry
- Movement: Baroque

Isabella (Rebecca) de Correa (c. 1655–c. 1700) was a Dutch Sephardic Jewish poet. Alongside Isabella Henríquez, she was one of the few Jewish women poets active in the Netherlands before the 19th century.

== Biography ==
Correa was born into a converso family in Lisbon. She later resided in Brussels, Antwerp, and Amsterdam. There, she was able to openly embrace her Judaism, taking on the Hebrew name Rebecca. She became an important figure in the city's Portuguese-Jewish community.

She was the second wife of the cosmographer and writer Nicolas de Olivier y Fullana (Daniel Judah) of Majorca. Correa was also a friend of the poet Daniel Levi de Barrios, whose Coro de las Musas she and her husband praised in verse. About her, de Barrios wrote:

She was an accomplished linguist, wrote delightful letters, composed exquisite verses, played the lute like a maestro, and sang like an angel. Her sparkling black eyes sent piercing darts into every beholder's heart, and she was famed for beauty as well as intellect.

== Work ==
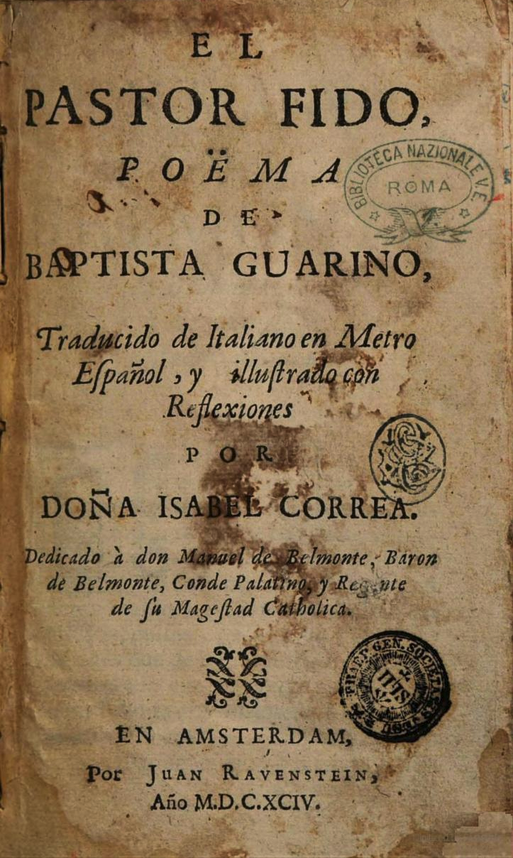
Title page of El pastor Fido (1694)

Her principal literary work is a metrical Spanish translation, accompanied by explanatory notes, of Il pastor fido ('The Faithful Shepherd') by Giovanni Battista Guarini. First published in Antwerp and Amsterdam in 1694, the work proved popular enough to be reprinted in several editions. It was dedicated to Manuel de Belmonte, the founder of De los Floridos, a poetry academy of which Correa was a member.

In her translation, Correa uses various verse forms and metres, so that some passages are written in ottava rima, while others adopt the décima or quintilla form. She takes the liberty to extend certain sections, offering paraphrases and incorporating her own ideas and observations.

Another work attributed to her, titled Varias Poesias, was purportedly prepared for publication but never printed.

== Publications ==
- El pastor Fido, poema de Baptista Guarino, traducido de Italiano en metro español, y ilustrado con reflexiones. Amsterdam: Juan Ravenstein. 1694.
