= Aurora Correa =

Mexican poet and writer

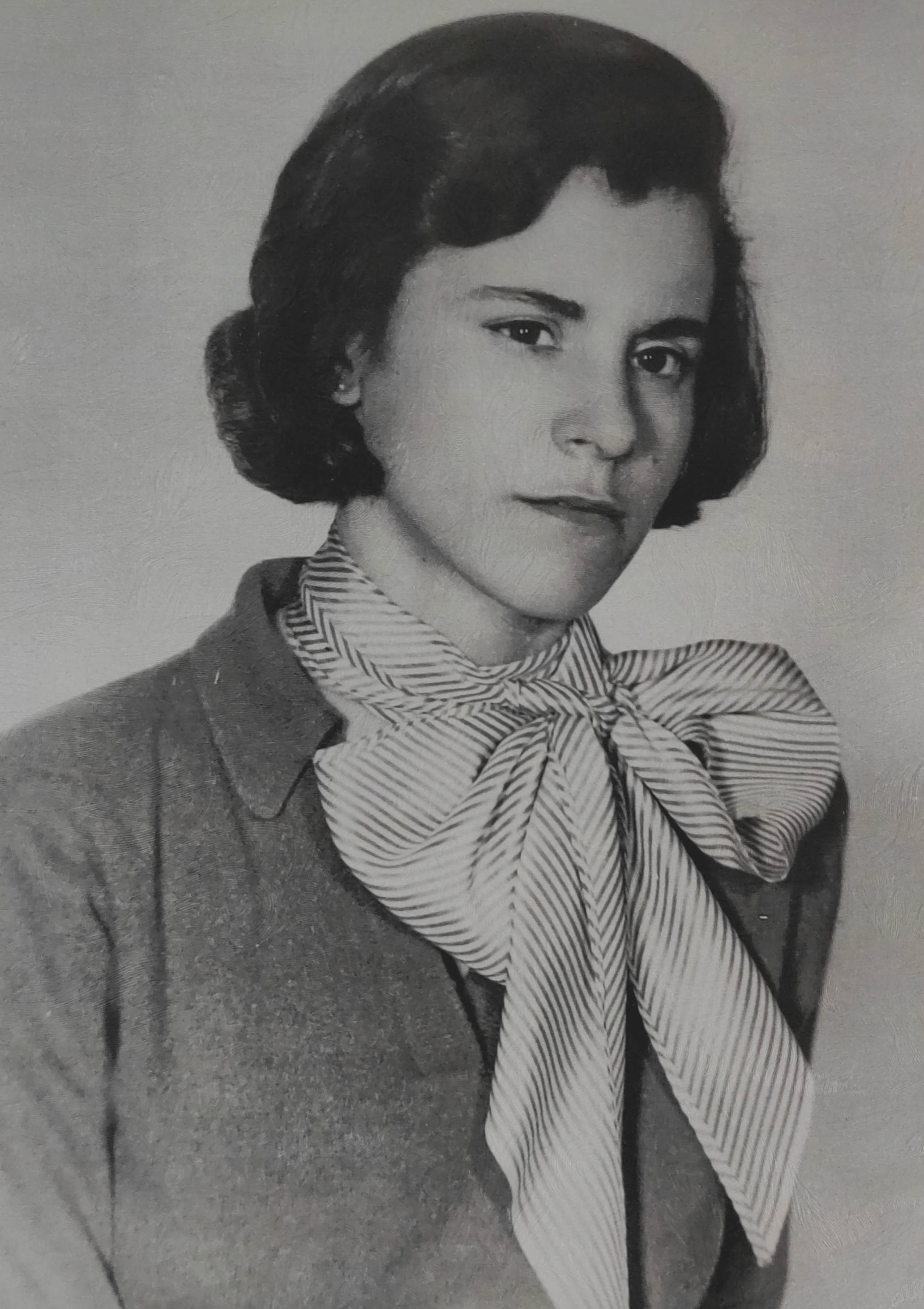
- Born: February 10, 1930; Barcelona, Spain
- Died: November 20, 2008 (aged 78); León, Guanajuato, Mexico
- Occupations: Teacher, writer
- Notable work: Cerezas

Aurora Correa (February 10, 1930 – November 20, 2008) was a Spanish-born teacher and writer, a naturalized Mexican who was part of the group of exiles known as the Children of Morelia (Spanish: Niños de Morelia), which arrived in Mexico during the Spanish Civil War. In her 2008 book Cerezas, she narrates her experiences through the journey and exile.

== Biography ==
Aurora Correa was born on February 10, 1930, in Barcelona. She arrived in Mexico in 1937, when she was 7 years old, as part of the group known as the Children of Morelia, exiled during the Spanish Civil War. As many of these children never returned to their homeland, they remained in the country and became naturalized Mexicans in 1967. (Note: Some sources indicate that it was in 1963.)

Correa's professional work was always related to education, literature, and the dissemination of culture. She taught Spanish in high school, worked as a screenwriter, was a copywriter and editor of various publishing houses, and also a radio actress. She wrote for print media such as El Día, El Nacional, Excélsior, Novedades, and Siempre! One such story, published in Novedades, narrates her experiences in the boarding school where she lived in childhood.

She published six books, including La muerte de James Dean (1991) and Ha (1992), which were finalists in the Planeta and Diana novel competitions respectively. Cerezas (2008), her last book, tells of her experiences as one of the Children of Morelia. Only one of her books, Odas (1976), is dedicated to poetry, and her work in this genre is little-known.

Aurora Correa died on November 20, 2008, in the city of León, Guanajuato.

== Books ==
- Agustina Ramírez: heroina del pueblo (1964)
- Odas (1976)
- La muerte de James Dean (1991), ISBN 9789682704192
- Ha (1992), ISBN 9789681323127
- Te beso buenas noches (1997), ISBN 9789687791777
- Cerezas (2008), ISBN 9789709885118
