= Moszczenica, Piotrków County =

Moszczenica
- Village
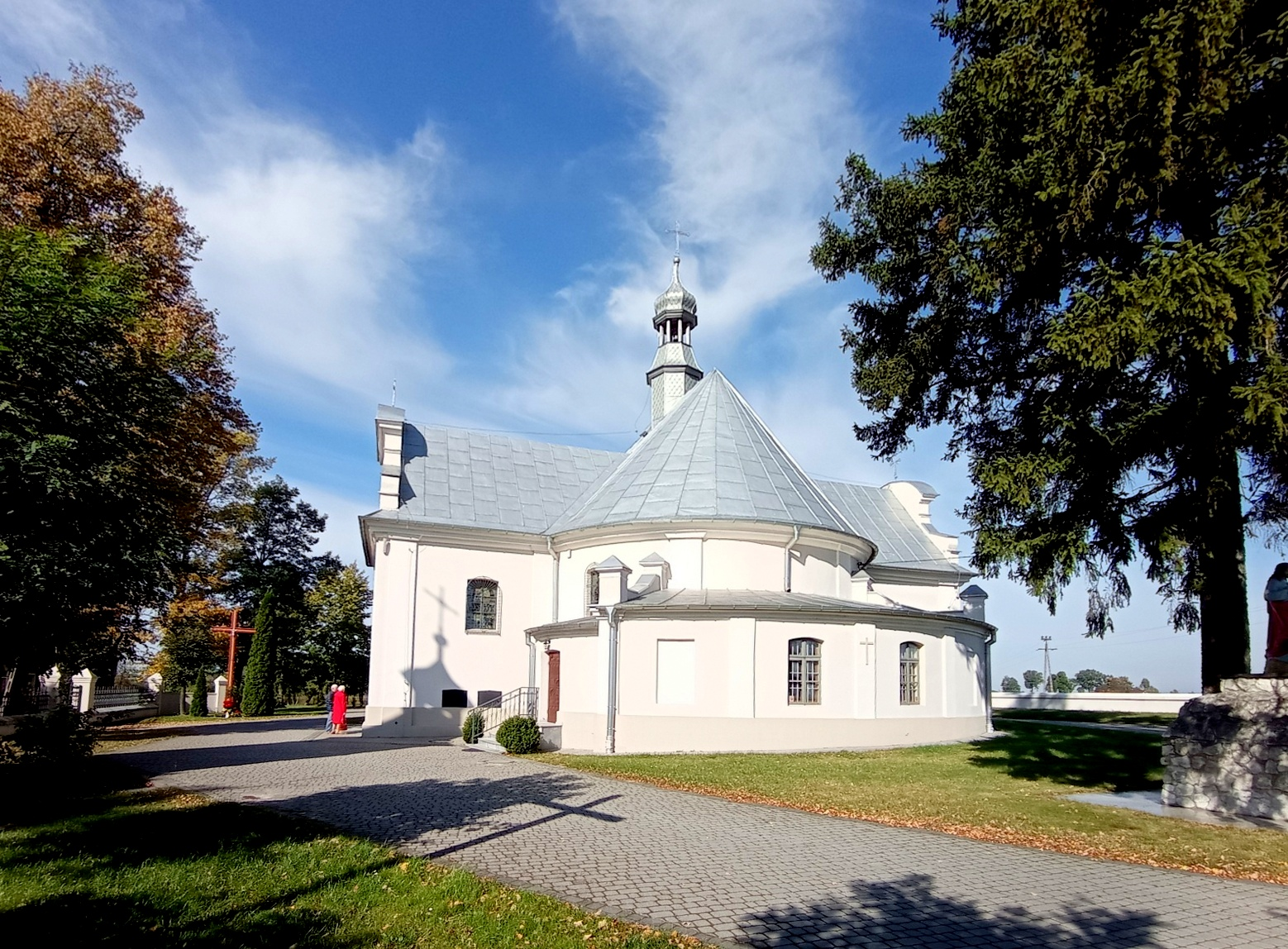
- Exaltation of the Holy Cross church in Moszczenica

- Location within Poland
- Coordinates: 51°30′N 19°43′E
- Country: Poland
- Voivodeship: Łódź
- County: Piotrków
- Gmina: Moszczenica
- Population: 2,571

Moszczenica [mɔʂt͡ʂɛˈnit͡sa] is a village in Piotrków County, Łódź Voivodeship, in central Poland. It is the seat of the gmina (administrative district) called Gmina Moszczenica.
