= Gajkowice =

- Village
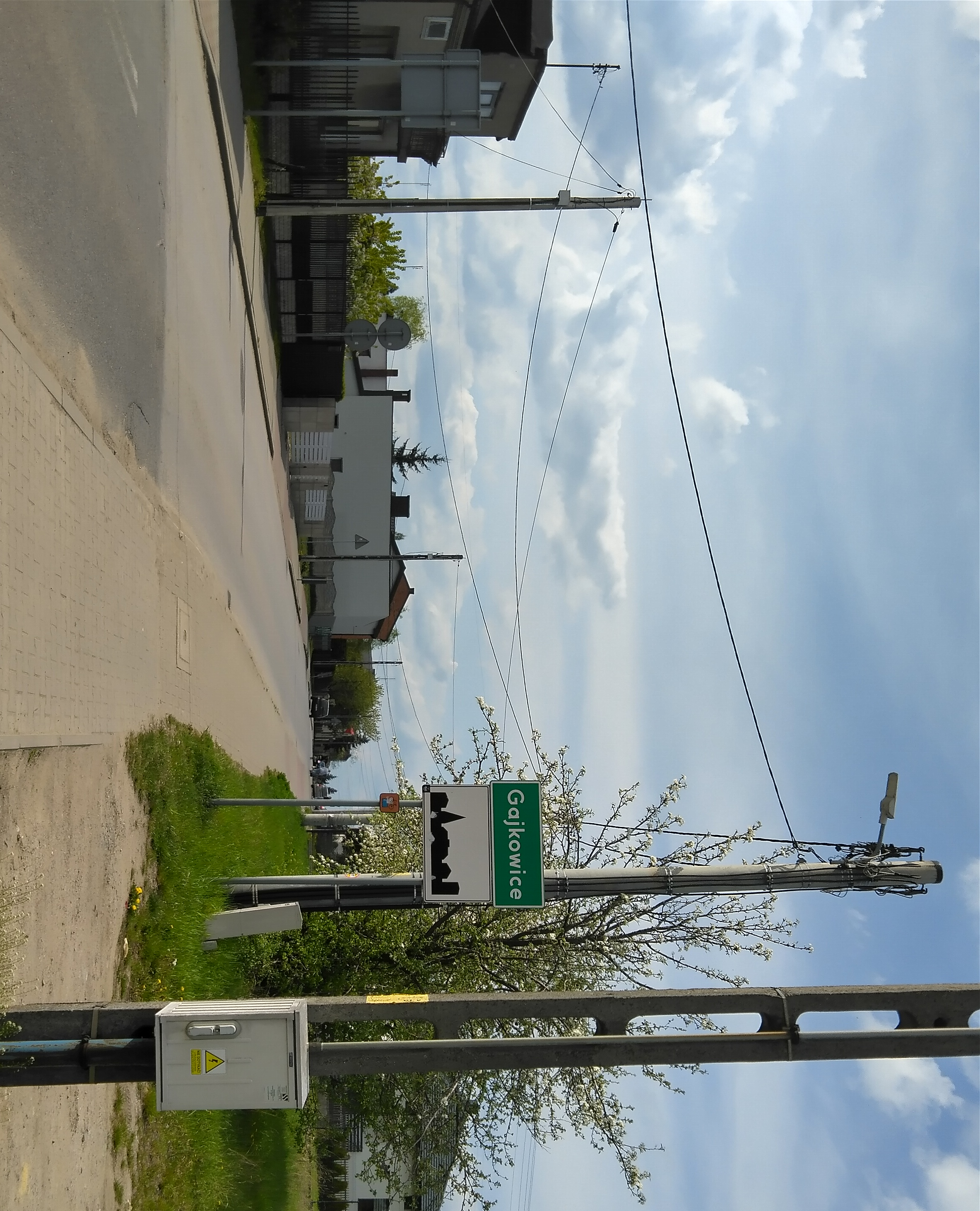

- Location within Poland
- Coordinates: 51°30′25″N 19°41′4″E
- Country: Poland
- Voivodeship: Łódź
- County: Piotrków
- Gmina: Moszczenica

Gajkowice [ɡai̯kɔˈvit͡sɛ] is a village in the administrative district of Gmina Moszczenica, within Piotrków County, Łódź Voivodeship, in central Poland.
