= Jarosty =

- Village
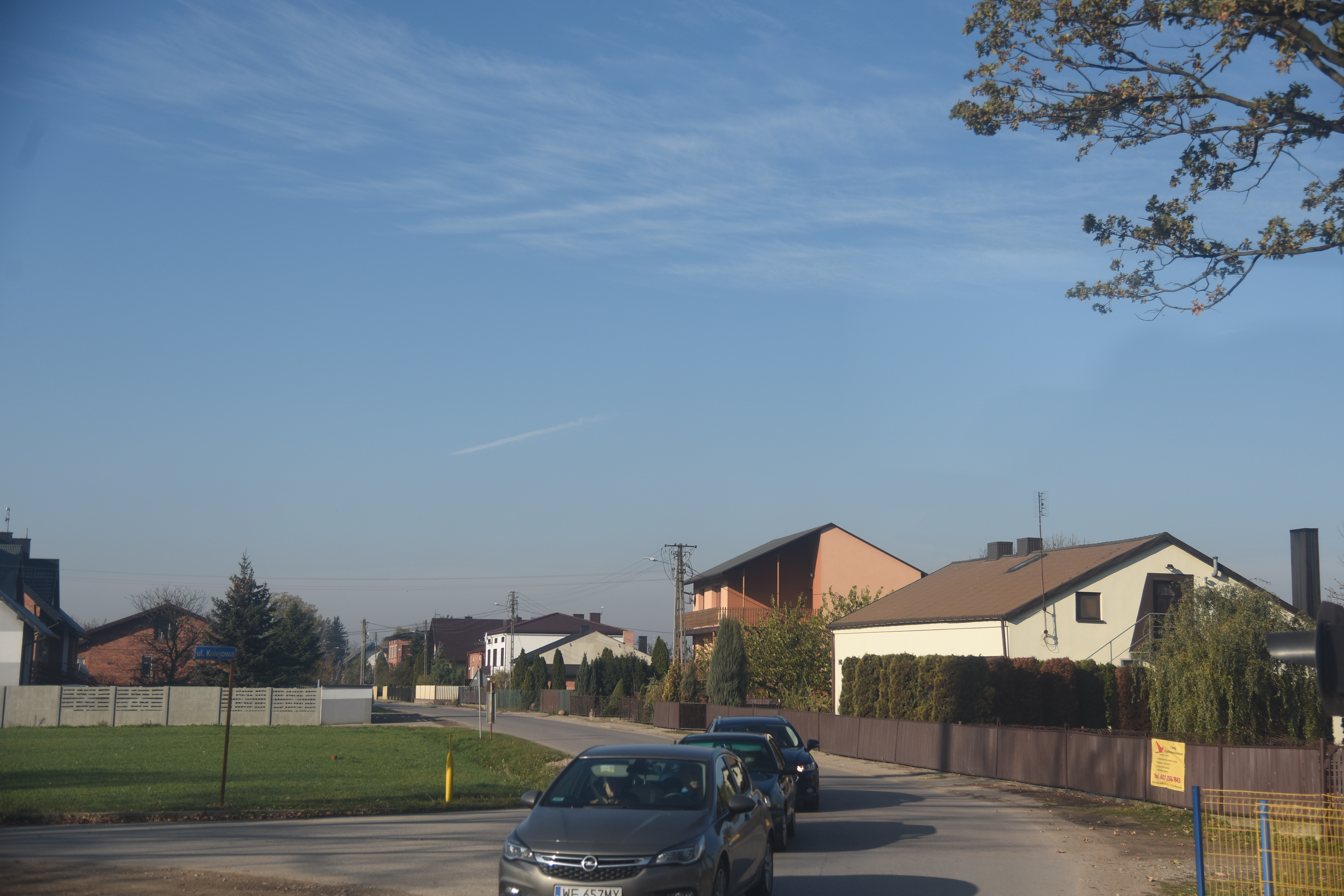

- Location within Poland
- Coordinates: 51°27′45″N 19°40′35″E
- Country: Poland
- Voivodeship: Łódź
- County: Piotrków
- Gmina: Moszczenica
- Population: 460

Jarosty [jaˈrɔstɨ] is a village in the administrative district of Gmina Moszczenica, within Piotrków County, Łódź Voivodeship, in central Poland.
