= Gościmowice Drugie =

- Village
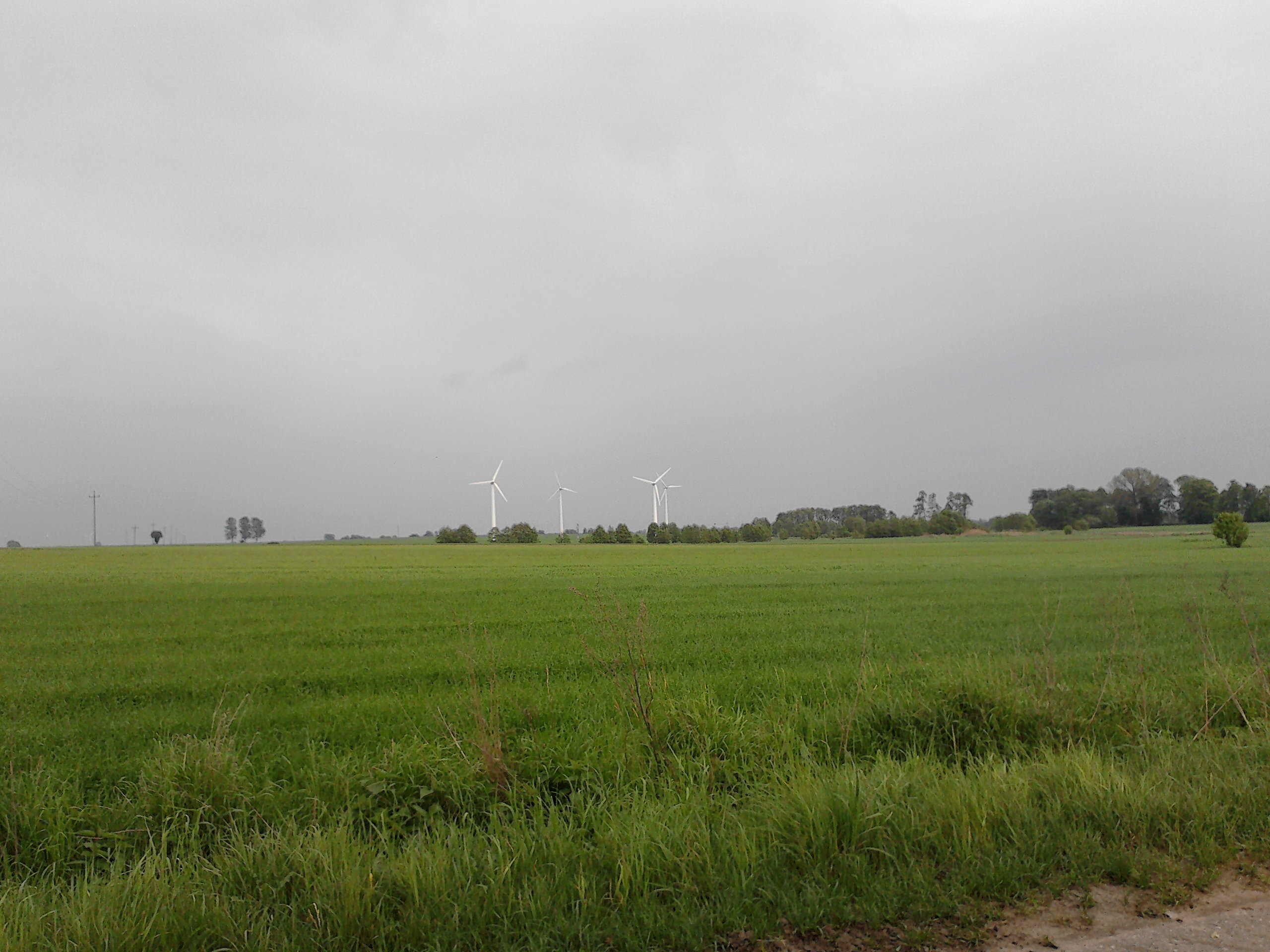
- Wind mills in Gościmowice

- Location within Poland
- Coordinates: 51°31′58″N 19°41′21″E
- Country: Poland
- Voivodeship: Łódź
- County: Piotrków
- Gmina: Moszczenica

Gościmowice Drugie (Polish pronunciation: [ɡɔɕt͡ɕimɔˈvit͡sɛ ˈdruɡʲɛ]) is a village in the administrative district of Gmina Moszczenica, within Piotrków County, Łódź Voivodeship, in central Poland.
