= Dąbrówka, Gmina Moszczenica =

Village in Gmina Moszczenica, Poland

Dąbrówka
- Village
- Location within Poland
- Coordinates: 51°31′38″N 19°36′30″E
- Country: Poland
- Voivodeship: Łódź
- County: Piotrków
- Gmina: Moszczenica

Dąbrówka [dɔmˈbrufka] is a village in the administrative district of Gmina Moszczenica, within Piotrków County, Łódź Voivodeship, in central Poland.
