= Srock =

- Village
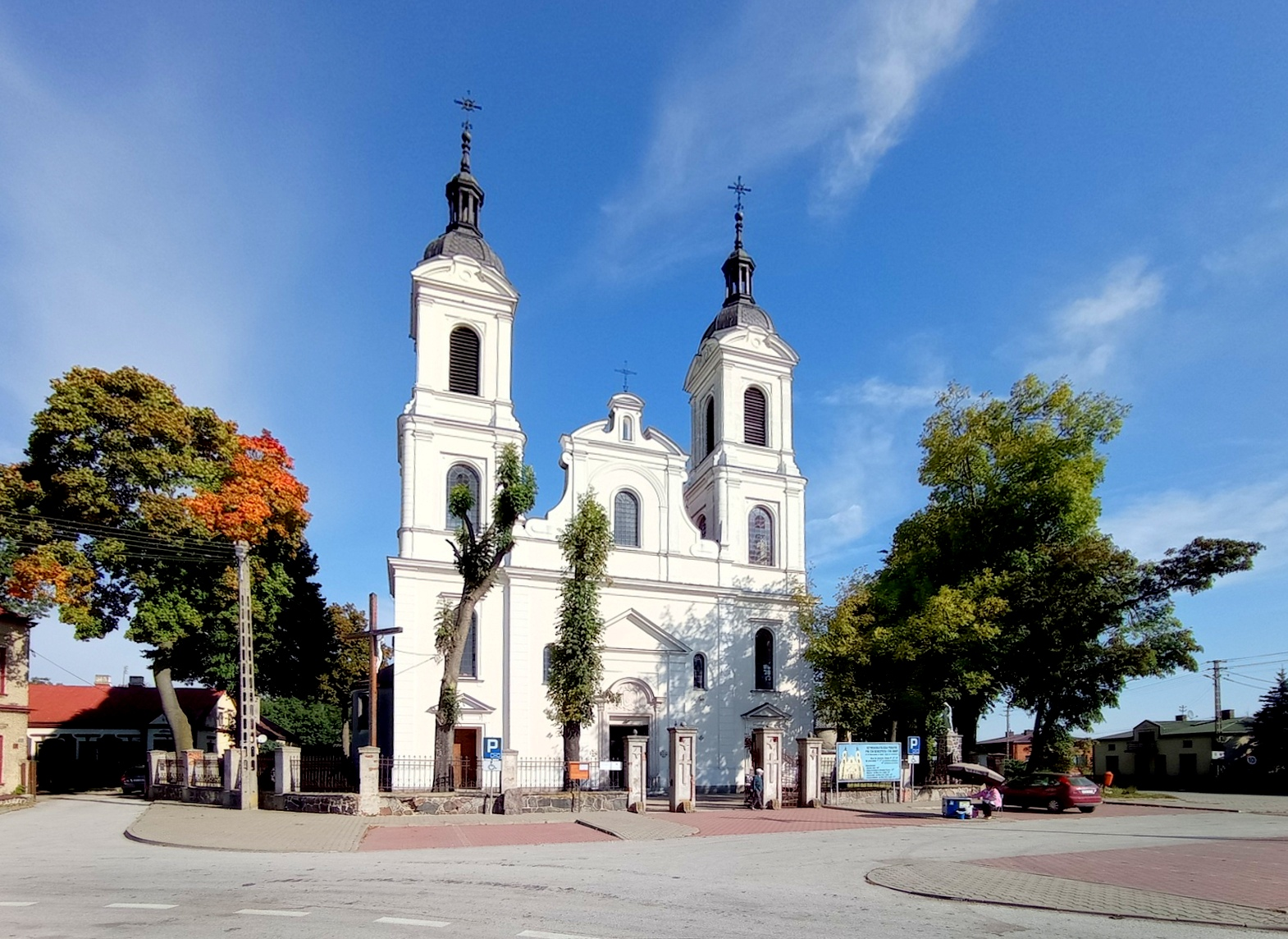

- Location within Poland
- Coordinates: 51°32′N 19°38′E
- Country: Poland
- Voivodeship: Łódź
- County: Piotrków
- Gmina: Moszczenica
- Population: 720

Srock [srɔt͡sk] is a village in the administrative district of Gmina Moszczenica, within Piotrków County, Łódź Voivodeship, in central Poland.
