= Gościmowice Pierwsze =

- Village
- Location within Poland
- Coordinates: 51°31′33″N 19°39′38″E
- Country: Poland
- Voivodeship: Łódź
- County: Piotrków
- Gmina: Moszczenica

Gościmowice Pierwsze (Polish pronunciation: [ɡɔɕt͡ɕimɔˈvit͡sɛ ˈpjɛrfʂɛ]) is a village in the administrative district of Gmina Moszczenica, within Piotrków County, Łódź Voivodeship, in central Poland.
