= Michałów, Piotrków County =

Michałów
- Village
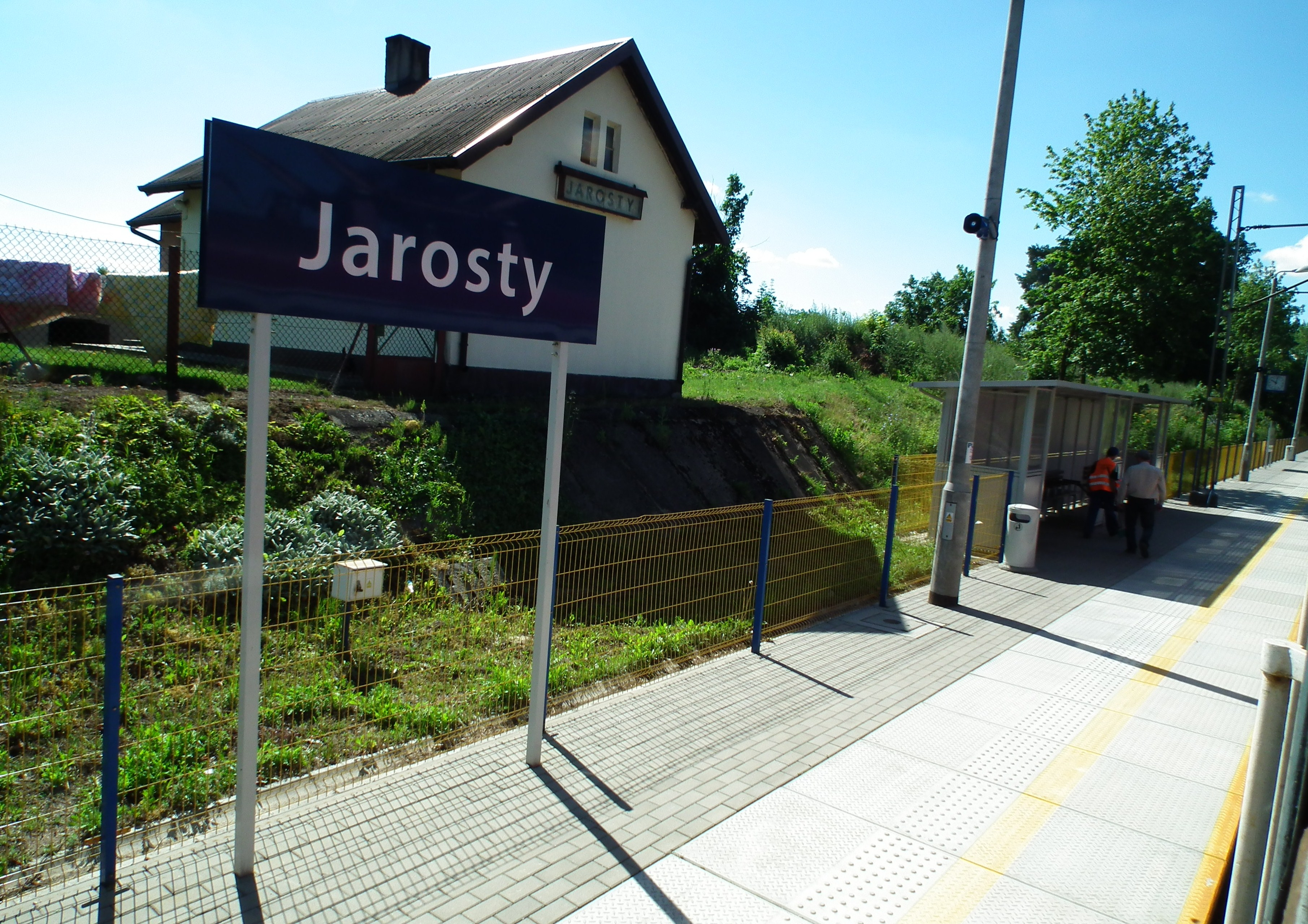
- Railway station

- Location within Poland
- Coordinates: 51°28′N 19°42′E
- Country: Poland
- Voivodeship: Łódź
- County: Piotrków
- Gmina: Moszczenica

Michałów [miˈxawuf] is a village in the administrative district of Gmina Moszczenica, within Piotrków County, Łódź Voivodeship, in central Poland.
