= Białkowice =

- Village
- Location within Poland
- Coordinates: 51°45′N 19°45′E
- Country: Poland
- Voivodeship: Łódź
- County: Piotrków
- Gmina: Moszczenica

Białkowice [bjau̯kɔˈvit͡sɛ] is a village in the administrative district of Gmina Moszczenica, within Piotrków County, Łódź Voivodeship, in central Poland.
