= Los Altísimos =

1951 novel by Huga Correa

- Author: Hugo Correa
- Language: Spanish
- Genre: Science fiction
- Published: Santiago de Chile, 1959
- Publisher: Ediciones Universitarias de Valparaíso
- Publication date: 1959
- Publication place: Chile
- English publication date: Unknown
- Pages: 272
- ISBN: 9789562397957

Los Altísimos is a science fiction book written by Hugo Correa published for the first time in 1951, and then after a process of editing and reviewing was published again in 1959 with a broader success. It's Correa's first book which gave him important recognition from the science fiction opinion leaders, also his work was compared with Ray Bradbury and Isaac Asimov. It's also known as the most important science fiction novel written in Chile.

== Content ==
Los Altísimos (The Superior Ones) is a future dystopia presented with adventure, intrigue, reflections about humanity and is critical implicitly of communist societies. It is about a world Cronn, which is an artificially constructed planet that travels at high speed across the universe. The main character is "X" who was kidnapped in Chile by people of this new world which at the beginning was presented as Poland. The planet inhabitants are subordinated to intelligent machines and to a mysterious overlord, also they cannot reproduce, establish a family, own private property, feel love, nor ever be unemployed.
