= Stara Gazomia =

- Village
- Location within Poland
- Coordinates: 51°29′49″N 19°44′31″E
- Country: Poland
- Voivodeship: Łódź
- County: Piotrków
- Gmina: Moszczenica

Stara Gazomia [ˈstara ɡaˈzɔmja] is a village in the administrative district of Gmina Moszczenica, within Piotrków County, Łódź Voivodeship, in central Poland.
