= Isabella Henríquez =

Sephardi Jewish poet

Isabella Henríquez (c. 1610 – between 1680 and 1684), also known as Isabella Enríquez, was a Sephardi Jewish poet.

Henríquez belonged to the converso community in Madrid where she distinguished herself in the different academies. Isaac Cardoso dedicated to her his work, Panegyrico y excelencias del color verde (Madrid, 1634), and Miguel de Silveira included a hymn of praise to her in his Parténope Ovante.

She left Spain sometime around 1635 to settle in Amsterdam, where she openly embraced Judaism. She became active in the literary circles of the Spanish and Portuguese Jewish community. It is reported that Henríquez distributed amulets alleged to protect against physical harm.

Her only-known surviving work is a décima dedicated to Rabbi Isaac Aboab, from her manuscript Obras Poeticas. The poem is quoted by Daniel Levi de Barrios, who dedicated two poems to her (reprinted in his 1686 work Bello monte de Helicona).
