= Agustina Ramírez =

Mexican national hero

- Anna Agustina de Jesús Ramírez Heredia
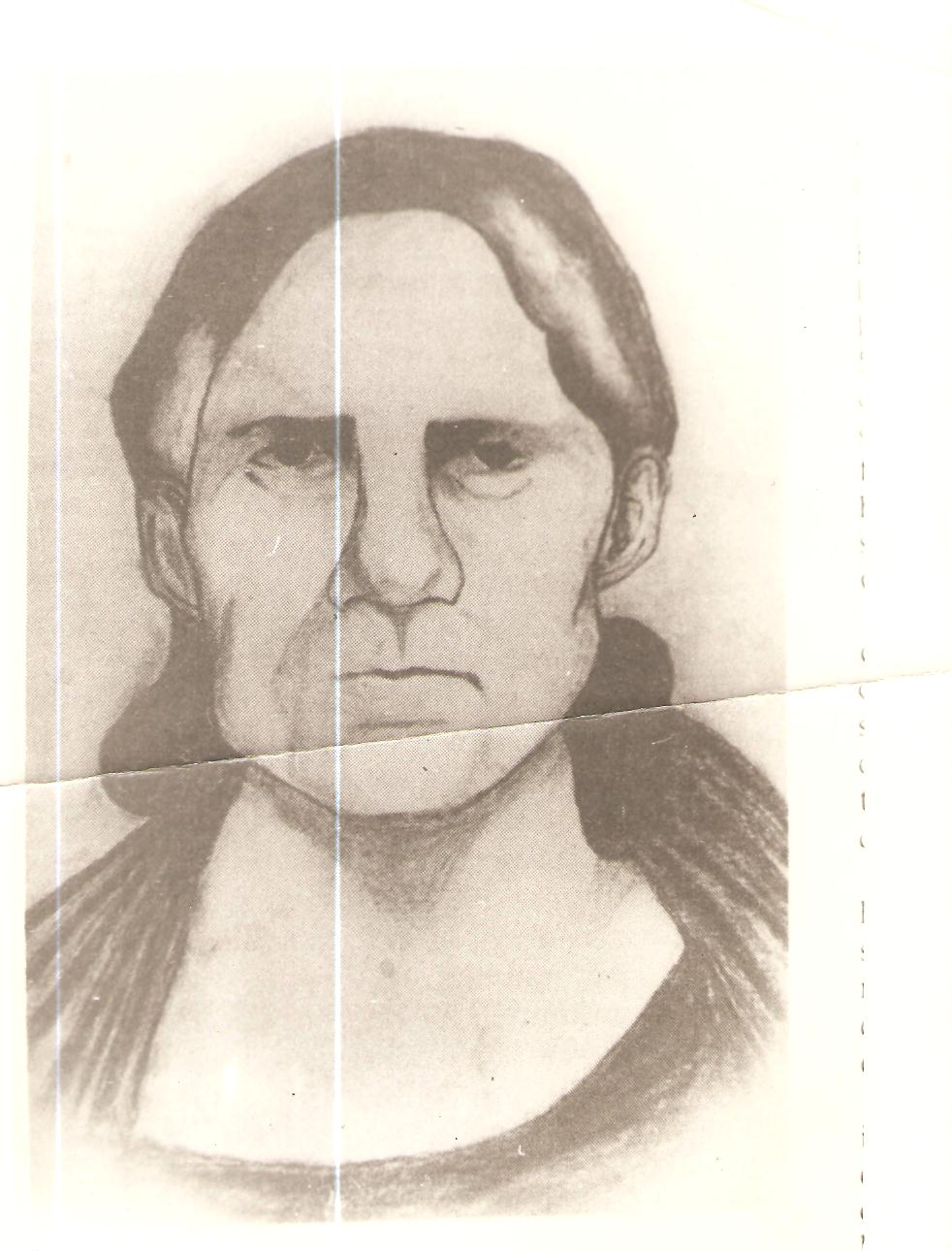
- Born: September 1, 1813; Villa de Mocorito, Sinaloa, Viceroyalty of New Spain
- Died: February 14, 1879 (aged 65); Mazatlan, Mexico
- Occupation: Nurse
- Known for: National hero

Anna Agustina de Jesús Ramírez Heredia (1813–1879) was a Mexican national hero which gave her 12 sons to Benito Juárez, the 26th president of Mexico, to defend the Mexican Republic from a French intervention. She was more commonly known as "La dama del ropaje negro".

== Biography ==
Anna Agustina de Jesús Ramírez Heredia was born in Mocorito, Sinaloa in 1813. She married the soldier Severiano Rodríguez, who gave her 13 sons and died in 1859. In the defense of the Republic, 12 out of her 13 sons died between 1863 and 1866. After the death of her sons, she lived in absolute poverty in Mazatlán.

She died on the 14 February 1879 from a fever. Her mortal remains were deposited in a common grave in the civil Pantheon of Mazatlán.

== Legacy ==
In 1958, Sinaloa's governor Gabriel Leyva issued an order to impose that her name be inscribed in gold in the Session Hall of the State Congress. The same year, a monument of hers was built, which is located in the capital of Sinaloa, on the intersection of Bravo and Madero streets.

In her honor, the "Agustina Ramírez State Award for Social Merit" was created in Mexico. It is awarded each year to women who have stood out for the community.

For having allowed her sons to sacrifice themselves for the republic, some historians like Eustaquio Buelna describe her as "The greatest heroine in Mexico".

=== Her sons ===
- Librado
- Francisco
- José María
- Victorio
- Antonio
- Juan José
- Juan Bautista
- Jesús
- Francisco
- Francisco
- Apolonio
- Segundo
