= Coorey =

Coorey is a surname. Notable people with the surname include:

- C.A. Coorey (1921–2004), Sri Lankan civil servant
- Matthew Coorey (born 1973), Australian conductor
- Michael Coorey (born 1975), rugby player
- Phil Coorey, Australian journalist

== See also ==
- Cooley (surname)
