= Arleene Correa Valencia =

Mexican-born textile artist (born 1993)

Arleene Correa Valencia (born 1993) is a Mexican-born embroidery and textile artist known for multiple solo and group exhibitions based on the emotional impacts of migrations through the perspective of family separation, identity, and visual representation on families migrating for a better life. Correa Valencia is known for her artworks based on embroidery, textiles, and clothing to tell the stories of immigration, invisibility, and family separation.

== Education and early life ==
Arleene Correa Valencia was born in 1993 in Michoacán, Mexico, and later immigrated to Napa Valley, California, at the age of three.

In 2015-2018, Correa Valencia received her Bachelors of Fine Art. In the year 2017, she also participated in a residency program at ACAID New York Studio Residency Program. In 2020, she received her Master of Fine Arts at California College of the Arts, in San Francisco.

She benefits from DACA, otherwise known as Deferred Action for Childhood Arrivals, and her background as an undocumented immigrant, which strongly impacts her artwork.

In 2018, Correa Valencia publicly opened up about her personal health journey after she and her brother learned they had the BRCA1 genetic mutation, which greatly raises the risk of breast cancer. Before her own diagnosis, she lost her aunt Asor to breast cancer at an early age, which led her family to get genetic testing. During her years of completing her Bachelor of Fine Arts, she began noticing physical symptoms that led her to get extensive medical examinations. After consulting with medical professionals, Correa Valencia chose to undergo a double mastectomy with reconstruction using her own tissue. Her reconstructive surgery took place in March 2019. Correa Valencia explains she didn't just want to share her story for herself, but instead, wanted to help others dealing with genetic cancer risk, early detection, or mastectomy.

== Selected works ==
In 2021, at the Trout Museum of Art in Appleton, Wisconsin, Correa Valencia presented her solo show Llévame Contigo, Yo Quiero Estar Contigo/ Take Me With You, I Want To Be With You. She presented an art installation, "Truth Farm," near Trump Winery to create conversations about the border.

In 2024, she exhibited Llevanos Contigo/ Take Us With You, at the Bolinas Museum in California, to shed some light on family separation caused by immigration policies.

Through 2024-2025, Correa Valencia opened an exhibition at the Utah Museum of Fine Arts, titled El Rancho/ The Ranch, La Guardia/The Guard, La Bestia/The Beast, and El Arbol/The Tree, to showcase her experience as an undocumented migrant and how that shaped her identity. Using different mediums and materials, Correa Valencia has created pieces like Pãpalõtl: Soñadores En Búsqueda de Amor/ Pãpalõtl: Dreams In Search of Love and A Donde Vamos?/Where Are We Going? that express the feelings she had as a young child migrating. Along with Hijos del Sol/Children of the Sun, which is a tribute to who her father, the focal point to most of her artworks.

== Awards ==
Correa Valencia received a regional Emmy award from the Headlands Center for the Arts for her piece REPRESENT: Portraits of Napa Workers. In 2023 she was named a Eureka Fellow by the Fleishhacker Foundation. Correa Valencia's first solo international presentation at a gallery was in the MCA Gallery in Ontario, Canada, in 2023 where she presented Por favor, no me olvides / Please don't forget me.
