= Bernardo Correa =

Chilean footballer (born 1995)

Personal information
- Full name: Bernardo Correa
- Date of birth: 19 July 1995 (age 31)
- Place of birth: Santiago
- Height: 1.87 m (6 ft 1 1/2 in)
- Position: Striker

Team information
- Current team: Deportes Valdivia
- Number: 15

Youth career
- 2010–2015: Universidad Católica

Senior career*
Years	Team	Apps	(Gls)
2015–	Universidad Católica	0	(0)
2015–	→ Deportes Valdivia (loan)	45	(9)
- * Club domestic league appearances and goals as of 15 November 2008 ‡ National team caps and goals as of 15 November 2008

Bernardo Correa (born 19 June 1995), is a Chilean footballer who plays as a striker for Deportes Valdivia in the Chilean Primera División.

== Club career ==
Bernardo did all lower in Universidad Católica but his debut was in Deportes Valdivia.
