= António Correia =

António Correia may refer to:

- António Correia (admiral) (c. 1487–1566), Portuguese commander who conquered Bahrain in 1521
- António Correia (Angolan footballer) (born 1983), Angolan footballer
- António Correia (sailor) (born 1933), Portuguese Olympic sailor
- António Correia de Oliveira (1879–1960), Portuguese poet
- António Jesus Correia (1924–2003), Portuguese footballer and roller hockey player
- António Mendes Correia (1888–1960), Portuguese anthropologist, physician and scientist
