= Pomyków, Łódź Voivodeship =

Pomyków
- Village
- Location within Poland
- Coordinates: 51°31′N 19°44′E
- Country: Poland
- Voivodeship: Łódź
- County: Piotrków
- Gmina: Moszczenica

Pomyków [pɔˈmɨkuf] is a village in the administrative district of Gmina Moszczenica, within Piotrków County, Łódź Voivodeship, in central Poland.
