= Ishvari Corea =

Sri Lankan librarian (1925–2019)

Ishvari Corea (4 June 1925 – 14 May 2019) was a Sri Lankan librarian. She served as Chief Librarian of the Colombo Public Library for 27 years.

== Biography ==
Corea was born in Araliyagaha Walauwa in Bandaragama; she was the fourth of five children of Don Bernard Wijesinghe Kannanagara and Beatrice Wijewardana Jayasekara. She attended Visakha Vidyalaya in Colombo and the University of Ceylon, Peradeniya. She graduated in 1949 with a degree in Sinhala.

After graduating from university, she taught at Visakha Vidyalaya for a short time, then joined the Colombo Public Library as deputy librarian in 1950. In 1959–60 she studied for a postgraduate qualification from the School of Librarianship and Archives of the University of London and the Chartered Institute of Library and Information Professionals (formerly the Library Association, UK).

In 1961 Corea was appointed Chief Librarian of Colombo Public Library in 1961, a position she held for 27 years. Corea also helped establish the Sri Lanka Library Association, and served as its president.

=== Publications ===
- Corea, I. (1975). Libraries and people: Colombo Public Library, 1925–1975. Colombo: Colombo Public Library.
- Corea, I. (1978). A manual for public libraries in Sri Lanka. Colombo: Colombo Public Library.
- Corea, I. (1993). Encyclopaedia of information and library science. New Delhi: Akashdeep Publishing House.

== Personal life ==
Corea was married to C. V. S. Corea, a homeopathic practitioner.
