= List of Odia films of 1984 =

This is a list of films produced by the Ollywood film industry based in Bhubaneshwar and Cuttack in 1984:

== A-Z ==
| Title | Director | Cast | Genre | Notes |
|---|---|---|---|---|
1984
| Basanta Rasa | Gurudas/Bansidhar Phanda | | | |
| Dheere Alua | Sagir Ahmad | Prithviraj Mishra, Soumitra, Dipen Ghosh | | |
| Dora | Prashanta Nanda | Prashanta Nanda, Shriram Panda, Mahasweta Roy | | |
| Gangashiuli | Srinibash Tripathy | Muna Khan, Sreela, Minaketan, Debu Bose | | |
| Jaga Balia | Prashanta Nanda | Prashanta Nanda, Shriram Panda, Mahasweta Roy, Dolly Jena | | |
| Jaiphula | Sidhartha | Uttam Mohanty, Aparajita Mohanty, Jaya Swami | | |
| Janani | Mohammed Mohsin | Uttam Mohanty, Aparajita Mohanty | | |
| Jeeban Sangam | Jeeban Mahanta | | | |
| Maya Miriga | Nirad N. Mohapatra | Bansidhar Satpathy, Kishori Debi, Binod Mishra | | |
| Ninad | J. H. Sattar | | | |
| Neeraba Jhada | Man Mohan Mahapatra | Hemanta Das, Niranjan Patnaik, Manimala | | |
| Pratidhwani | P. C. Das | | | |
| Radha | J. H. Sattar | Surya Misra | | |
| Satya Harishchandra | C. S. Rao | | | |
