= Gmina Moszczenica, Łódź Voivodeship =

Gmina Moszczenica Moszczenica Commune
- Gmina
- Flag Coat of arms
- Interactive map of Gmina Moszczenica
- Coordinates (Moszczenica): 51°30′N 19°43′E
- Country: Poland
- Voivodeship: Łódź
- County: Piotrków County
- Seat: Moszczenica

Area
  - Total: 111.63 km^{2} (43.10 sq mi)

Population (2006)
  - Total: 12,766
  - Density: 114.36/km^{2} (296.19/sq mi)
- Website: http://www.moszczenica.pl

Gmina Moszczenica is a rural gmina (administrative district) in Piotrków County, Łódź Voivodeship, in central Poland. Its seat is the village of Moszczenica, which lies approximately 12 kilometres (7 mi) north of Piotrków Trybunalski and 36 km (22 mi) south-east of the regional capital Łódź.

The gmina covers an area of 111.63 square kilometres (43.1 sq mi), and as of 2006 its total population is 12,766.

== Villages ==
Gmina Moszczenica contains the villages and settlements of Baby, Białkowice, Dąbrówka, Gajkowice, Gazomka, Gościmowice Drugie, Gościmowice Drugie-Powęziny, Gościmowice Pierwsze, Jarosty, Karlin, Kiełczówka, Kosów, Michałów, Moszczenica, Moszczenica-Osiedle, Moszczenica-Wola, Nowa Gazomia, Podolin, Pomyków, Raciborowice, Raków, Raków Duży, Rękoraj, Sierosław, Srock and Stara Gazomia.

== Neighbouring gminas ==
Gmina Moszczenica is bordered by the city of Piotrków Trybunalski and by the gminas of Będków, Czarnocin, Grabica, Tuszyn and Wolbórz.
