= Correia family =

Noble medieval family

Coat of arms of the Correia family

The Correia family (also spelled Correa in Spanish) is a noble medieval family of Portuguese Christian conquerors of the Reconquista that originated in Salceda, Spain,

== History ==
The origin of the Correia family is from the village of Salceda de Caselas, district of Tui, Pontevedra, Kingdom of Galicia. The history of the family is linked with that of Portugal. Their ancestors arrived in Portugal in the early 11th century, at service to Henry of Burgundy, Count of Portucale (1066 -1112).

This family line comes from Paio Ramiro, a noble medieval knight. His descendants had led military campaigns against the Moors in the Algarve, which culminated in the taking of Silves and was crucial to the final conquest of that region in 1249 during the reign of Sancho II.

The Portuguese surname "Correia" is of occupational origin. The name is derived from the Portuguese word correia, meaning "a leather strap or belt" (Latin corrigia, "fastening," from corrigere, "to straighten or to correct"), applied as a metonymic occupational name for a maker or seller of leather belts and straps. The name is found throughout Portugal and also in the Galicia region of northwest Spain. A notable bearer of the name was António Correia, a Portuguese commander who in 1521 conquered Bahrain, beginning eighty years of Portuguese rule in the Persian Gulf state.

D. Paio Peres Correia (Pelayo Pérez Correa in Spanish), a notable medieval Portuguese Christian, is the ancestor of Saint Nuno of Saint Mary (Holy Constable Dom Nuno Álvares Pereira) whose daughter Beatriz Pereira Alvim married D. Afonso, the illegitimate son of King João I and of D. Inês Pires Esteves and future Duke of Braganza. This marriage established the House of Braganza and became the reigning house of Portugal in 1640. It has been linked over the centuries until the present day with the royal houses and Catholic principalities in Europe and Brazil.
