= Korea, Virginia =

Unincorporated community in Virginia, United States

Coordinates: 38°37′53″N 78°00′46″W

Korea is a town in Culpeper County, Virginia, United States. As of the 2010 United States census, the population in Korea was 1,951.

== History ==
A post office called Korea was established in 1899, and remained in operation until it was discontinued in 1951. The community was named after Korea, in East Asia.
