= Kosów, Łódź Voivodeship =

Kosów
- Village
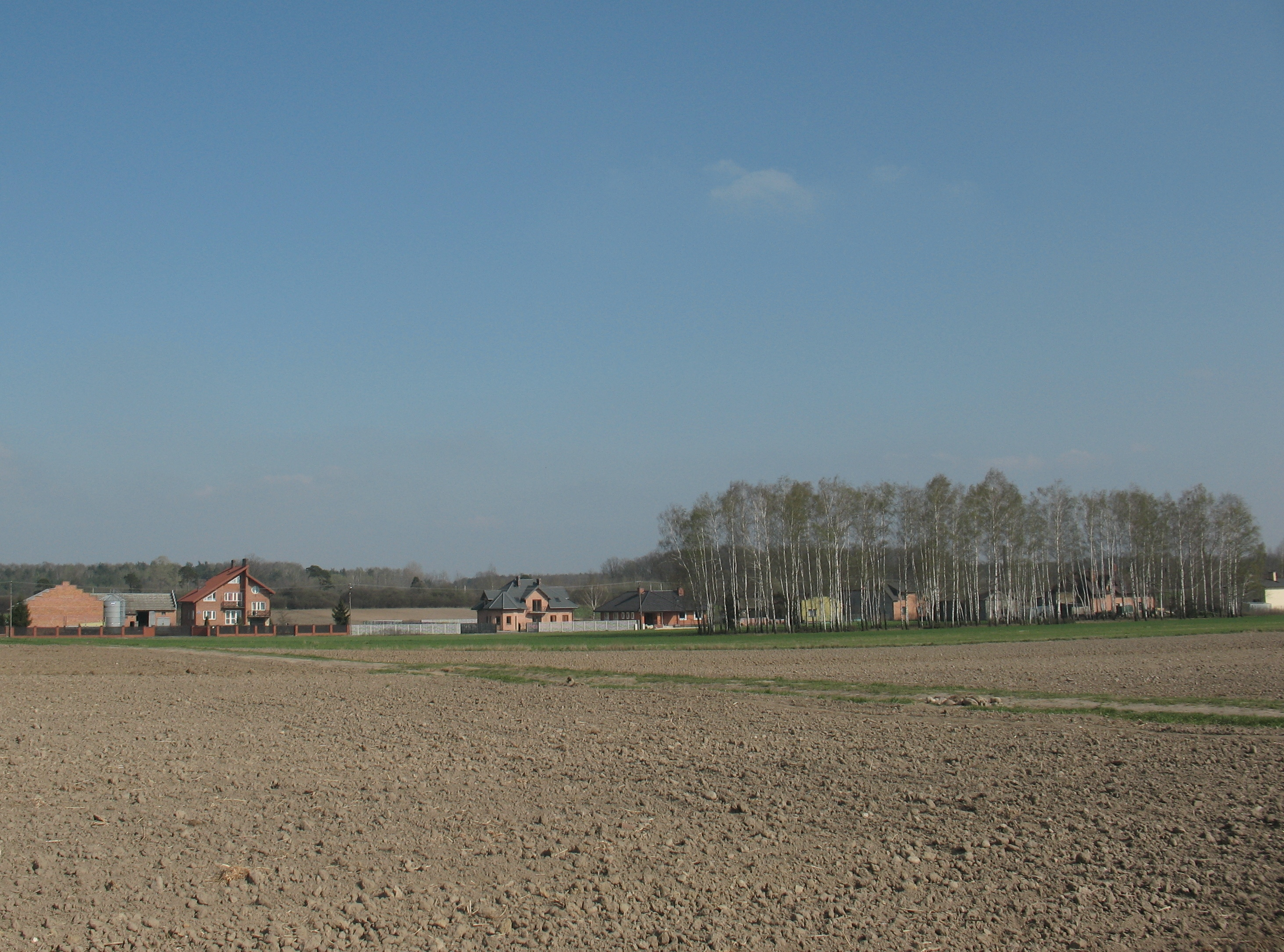

- Location within Poland
- Coordinates: 51°29′N 19°41′E
- Country: Poland
- Voivodeship: Łódź
- County: Piotrków
- Gmina: Moszczenica
- Established: before 1386
- Population (2009): 648
- Postal code: 97-310
- Area code: +48 044

Kosów [ˈkɔsuf] is a village in the administrative district of Gmina Moszczenica, within Piotrków County, Łódź Voivodeship, in central Poland.
