= Hugo Correa =

Chilean writer (1926–2008)

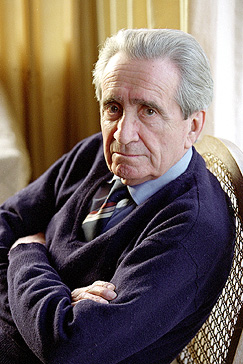
Hugo Correa 2008

Hugo Correa (May 24, 1926, in Curepto – March 23, 2008, in Santiago de Chile) was a Chilean journalist and science fiction writer, and is widely credited with launching modern science fiction in Latin America. A couple of his stories appeared in The Magazine of Fantasy & Science Fiction. He also was a columnist in Chile at the Chilean journals “El Mercurio” and “La Tercera”, also at the Chilean magazines “Ercilla” and “Revista Paula". Also, he was the president of the cultural committee of the Instituto Chileno Norteamericano; co-founder of the Chilean SF Club and president of UFO Chile.

== Life and career ==
Correa was born in the southern Chilean province of Talca in the town of Curepto. His writing career began in journalism, and from there branched out to include criticism, drama, and prose fiction. Although he has written realist works, he primarily works in science fiction, a genre he first became interested in after reading the works of Ray Bradbury, Clifford D. Simak, and Theodore Sturgeon. Correa has the distinction of being one of the first Latin American science fiction writers to be published in the United States. His story “The Last Element” was published in The Magazine of Fantasy & Science Fiction in 1962 after receiving the support of Ray Bradbury. His story “Alter Ego” was also published in the same magazine in 1967, and it was later picked up by other publications. At that time, being published in the United States was the greatest sign of success for Latin American science fiction writers, and so his publications became very inspiring to his contemporary writers in the region. After the late 1980s he became less productive as writer, but remained active collaborator of the Chilean sf community, participating in round tables, giving interviews, attending book launches and judging at writing competitions until his death in 2008.

== Works ==
His works are mostly about science fiction, finding text about extraterrestrials, flying vehicles, UFOs, unknown worlds, space exploration, authoritarianism and futuristic technology advanced at his times. His most celebrated and prized book is Los Altísimos (The Superior Ones).

In Chile, the general culture never recognized his work despite being the only Latin American writer cited at The Encyclopedia of Science Fiction.
