= Mário Barreto Corrêa Lima =

Mário Barreto Corrêa Lima (Ceará, 7 September 1935), is a Brazilian generalist doctor, professor and one of the founders of UNIMED in Rio de Janeiro.

He is also 1955 Miss Brasil Emilia Correa Lima's brother.
