= Vernon Cooray =

Sri Lankan scientist

- Education: De Mazenod College University of Colombo Uppsala University
- Occupation: Professor of Electrical Engineering
- Employer: Uppsala University
- Known for: Lightning Research High Voltage Engineering Discharge Physics
- Spouse: Ruby Cooray
- Children: 2

Vernon Cooray is a Sri Lankan scientist who is an emeritus professor at the Department of Electrical Engineering at Uppsala University, Sweden. As a scientist he has concentrated on solving both physics and engineering problems related to lightning physics, lightning protection and physics of electrical discharges. This research work has resulted in more than 600 research publications. He was the Ph.D. thesis supervisor of more than thirty researchers, both at Uppsala and foreign universities, who are now actively engaged in lightning research and lightning protection in different parts of the world.

== Early life and career ==
In 2014, he was elected as the president of the International Conference on Lightning Protection (ICLP) for a period of six years. ICLP is considered as the most prestigious conference in the world that addresses the problems related to lightning physics and lightning protection and attended by lightning researchers and engineers from all over the world. From 2000 to 2017, he was the professor responsible for the research and Ph.D. studies in the field of atmospheric electrical discharges at Uppsala University. Vernon Cooray has also contributed to educate the general public on lightning and lightning protection through newspapers, radio and television. Vernon Cooray has edited three books and authored two books on lightning physics and lightning protection.

== Research ==
He is the first scientist to show that the basic foundation of all engineering return stroke models are the same even though they are expressed in different mathematical formulations. He is also the first scientist to resolve one of the controversies that existed in 1980s between the EMC engineers and Power engineers related to the theories of interaction of lightning electromagnetic fields with power lines by showing that a model developed by Prof. Sune Rusck, and used frequently by power engineers, is identical to the model developed by Agrawal et al., frequently used by EMC engineers. He and his collaborators were the first group of scientists to show that lightning cloud flashes are as efficient as lightning ground flashes in generating nitrogen oxides. He together with Prof. Marcos Rubinstein developed the Cooray-Rubinstein approximation which is frequently used in analysing the voltages induced in power lines by lightning. Vernon Cooray and Marley Becerra developed the lightning interaction simulation program SLIM that can be used to predict the location of lightning strikes to structures. He together with Dr. Gerald Cooray illustrated a connection between classical electromagnetic fields and time energy uncertainty principle.

== Awards ==
He has been awarded the Doctor of Science (D.Sc.) honorary degree from University of Colombo in Sri Lanka, the IEEE fellow membership, the Karl Berger award from the international scientific committee of ICLP, and the best book award from the Atmospheric Science Librarians International (ASLI).
