= Manuel Pio Correia =

Portuguese botanist

Manuel Pio Correia (1874–1934) was a Portuguese botanist.

Correia's study into botany focused primarily on the scientific, economic, and industrial means of crop production.

He had a wife, Mercedes Veloso, and a son, Manuel Pio Correia Jr. At the time of his death, Correia was a researcher at the Museum of Natural History in Paris.
