= Correa =

Correa may refer to:

- Correa (surname)
- Correa (insect), a genus of beetles in the family Staphylinidae
- Correa (plant), a genus of Australian plants named after Portuguese botanist José Correia da Serra
- Difuntos Correa, a Chilean rock band

== See also ==
- Correia, the Portuguese and Galician form of the word
- Corea (disambiguation), an alternate spelling and homonym
