= Janani Cooray =

Sri Lankan performance artist and painter

- Born: Bulathsinhalage Janani Chandima Cooray
- Education: University of the Visual and Performing Arts; University of Kelaniya
- Known for: Osariya (2015)
- Website: jananicooray.com

Bulathsinhalage Janani Chandima Cooray is a Sri Lankan contemporary performance artist, art educator and painter. She is regarded as one of the leading performance artists in Sri Lanka. She has held exhibitions around the world, including Bangalore, Colombo and London.

== Career ==
Cooray initially began her career as a painter and later switched to performance art in 2003 after being acknowledged about the concept of live art at the Theertha International Arts Workshop in 2003. She also took part in the event and showcased her first performance art Cage She developed the interest on performance art at a time when it was not officially considered as a concept in Sri Lanka. Janani pursued her higher studies in the field of performance art from the University of the Visual and Performing Arts. Her notable performance My Web came at the Live Art 2011 exhibition where she depicted that her long hair had become her signature style in the professional life.

She has also performed exhibitions about the socio-cultural obstacles for women in the Sri Lankan society regarding the selection of clothing. Janani who is also a school teacher is a vocal critic of mandatory rule on women teachers wearing sari in government schools. Janani received media attention in 2015 for her street performance wearing a traditional Sri Lankan Osariya costume along with covering her body with barbed metal wires.

== Misinformation ==
Her image of wearing Osariya along with whole body being covered with barbed wires in a 2015 street performance became viral in the social media in September 2020 as many users in India falsely interpreted that the woman showed her frustration after the Hathras gang rape and murder by dressing up herself with barbed wires.
