= Miguel de Barrios =

Spanish Jewish poet and historian (1635–1701)

- Born: 1635; Montilla, Spain
- Died: 1701 (aged 65–66); Amsterdam, Netherlands
- Occupations: Poet, playwright, historian

Miguel de Barrios (a.k.a. Daniel Levi de Barrios; 1635 – 1701) was a poet, playwright, and historian, born in Montilla, Spain, to a Portuguese converso family. He eventually settled in Amsterdam in the Portuguese Jewish community. He was a prolific author, whose best known works are a memorialization of victims of the Inquisition, Contra la verdad no hay fuerza (before 1672), and a laudatory portrayal of Amsterdam's Sephardic community, Triumpho del govierno popular (1683). He was one of several writers to focus on "the [Jewish] Law's perfection, eternity and superiority." In his work, Triumpho del govierno popular (1682) he gave an explanation for the permanent expulsion of Spinoza from the Amsterdam synagogue, saying it was Spinoza's defiance of rabbinic authority and declaration that "the Jews have no obligation to observe Mosaic Law."

== Early life ==
His parents were Simon de Barrios, also known as Jacob Levi Canizo, and Sarah Valle; his grandfather was Abraham Levi Canizo.

A family member was tried by the Spanish Inquisition, and Barrios's father fled to Portugal, and remained for a time at Marialva, and also in the vicinity of Villa-Flor. Not feeling safe in Portugal, he went to Algeria. Miguel went to Italy and lived for a time at Nice, France, where his paternal aunt was married to Abraham de Torres. He then stayed for a longer time at Livorno, where another sister of his father, the wife of Isaac Cohen de Sosa, prevailed upon him to declare himself publicly a Jew. Soon after he married Deborah Vaez, a relative of his brother-in-law, Eliahu Vaez, from Algeria, and afterward determined to leave Europe. On 20 July 1660, he, with 152 coreligionists and fellow-sufferers set sail for the West Indies. Soon after his arrival at Tobago his young wife died, and he returned to Europe. He went to Brussels and there entered the military service of Spain.

== Military service ==
De Barrios spent some years in Brussels, where he came much in contact with Spanish and Portuguese knights, and where he was soon advanced to the rank of captain. Here he wrote his well-known poetic work "Flor de Apolo" (see below), his dramas, and "Coro de las Musas," in which he sang the praises of the reigning monarchs of Europe and of the then most flourishing cities, Madrid, Lisbon, Paris, London, Rome, and Amsterdam. Here also he planned his greatest poetical work, which was to deal with the Pentateuch, and which was to be divided into twelve parts, each part to be dedicated to a European ruler. He intended to call it the "Imperio de Dios" or "Harmonia del Mundo". Several potentates had already sent the poet their likenesses, their genealogies, and their coats of arms, and had promised the means for the production of the work, when the board of wardens ("ma'amad") and the rabbis of the Amsterdam community refused to give the necessary "approbation" for the publication of the work, through which, they held, the law of God might be profaned.

== Later life ==
In 1674 De Barrios left the Spanish service and returned to Amsterdam, where he joined the numerous followers of Sabbatai Zevi. He firmly believed that the Messiah would appear on the Jewish New Year of 5435 (1675 CE). On the Passover preceding that holy day he suddenly became insane, fasted for four days, refused to take any nourishment, and in consequence was so weakened that he was not expected to survive. Only the earnest remonstrances of the eminent Rabbi Jacob Sasportas, who had given him advice in regard to the compilation of his "Harmonia del Mundo", and who possessed his full confidence, prevailed with him and induced him to take food and thus by degrees to regain his strength. De Barrios remained in poor circumstances all his life. In order to earn money for those nearest to him, he sang the praises of the rich Spanish-Portuguese Jews on sad and joyous occasions, or dedicated his minor works to them. His writings are frequently the only sources of information concerning the scholars, philanthropic institutions, and Jewish academies of his time, though the information given is not always reliable. He was buried in the cemetery of Amsterdam, next to his second wife, Abigail, daughter of Isaac de Pina, whom he had married in 1662, and who died in 1686.

He composed for himself the following epitaph, in Spanish:

"Ya Daniel y Abigail Levi ajuntarse bolvieron. Por un Amor en las Almas, Por una losa en los cuerpos. Porque tanto en la vida se quisieron Que aun despues de la muerte un vivir fueron."

("Now Daniel and Abigail Levi have become united again. By a love in their souls; by a stone in their bodies. So much in life they loved each other that even after death they were one being.")

== Works ==
De Barrios was the most fruitful poet and author among all the Spanish-Portuguese Jews of his time. Hardly a year passed that did not see the publication of one or more of his writings. His principal works are: Flor de Apolo, containing romances, "dezimas," 62 sonnets, and the three comedies, Pedir Favor al Contrario, El Canto Junto al Encanto, and El Espanjol de Oran, (Brussels, 1663); Contra la Verdad no ay Fuerca, (Amsterdam, 1665–67), a panegyric on Abraham Athias, Jacob Rodrigues Caseres, and Rachel Nuñez Fernandez, who were burned as martyrs at Cordova; Coro de las Musas, in nine parts (Brussels, 1672); Imperio de Dios en la Harmonia del Mundo, (Brussels, 1670–74) (the second edition contains 127 verses; the first, but 125); Sol de la Vida, (Brussels, 1673); Mediar Estremos, Decada Primera en Ros Hasana, Amsterdam, 1677; Metros Nobles, Amsterdam; Triumpho Cesareo en la Descripcion Universal de Panonia, y de la Conquista de la Ciudad de Buda, (celebrating the conquest of Budapest by the Habsburgs from the Ottoman Empire, Amsterdam, 1687); Dios con Nos Otros, (1688); Historia Real de la Gran Bretaña, ib. 1688; Arbol de la Vida con Raizes de la Ley, ib. 1689.

The opuscula, or minor literary and biographical works, of De Barrios appeared under various titles at different periods, in two different editions. They treated of the various "hermandades academicas" and "academias caritativas." The often-quoted "Relacion de los Poetas, y Escriptores Españoles de la Nacion Judayca" and "Hetz Jaim (Hayyim), Arbol de las Vidas," which treat of the Amsterdam scholars, are of most value. Both have been reprinted, with explanatory notes, in "Revue Etudes Juives," xviii. 281–289, xxxii. 92–101. His last work bears the title "Piedra Derribadora de la Sonjada Estatua Desde el Año de 1689 al de 1700" (no date).

A certain Daniel Lopes Barrios, who lived in America in 1748, may have been a descendant.
