= Nicholas-Joseph Laforêt =

Belgian Catholic philosopher and theologian

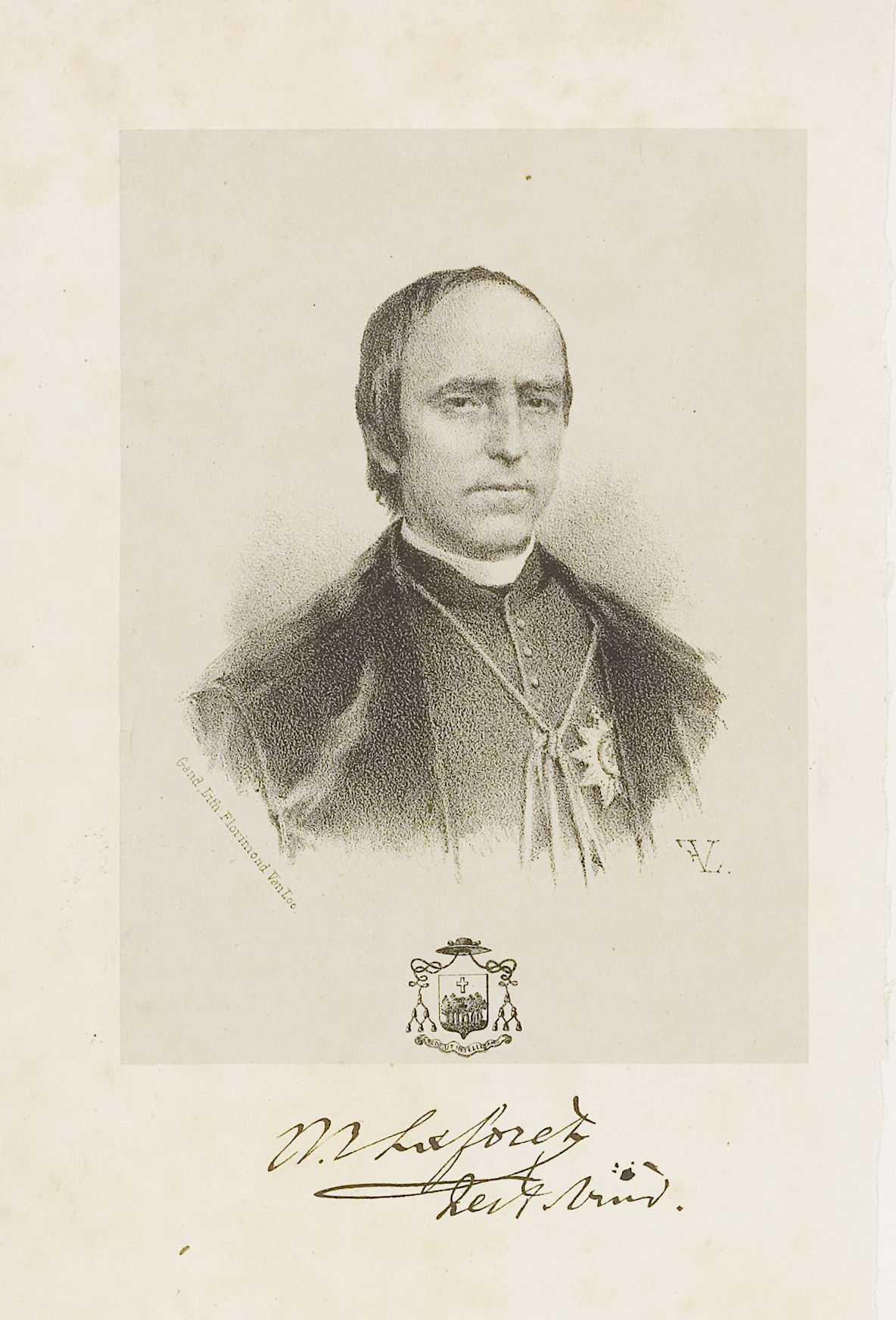
Nicolas-Joseph Laforêt

Nicholas-Joseph Laforêt (born at Graide, 23 January 1823; died at Leuven, 26 January 1872) was a Belgian Catholic philosopher and theologian.

== Life ==
After the regular theological course at the seminary of Namur, he entered the Catholic University of Leuven (French: Louvain), where he applied himself especially to the study of Semitic languages, Holy Scripture, and philosophy. In 1848, he was appointed to the chair of moral philosophy at the university, and, the same year, received the doctorate in theology.

Two years later he became president of the Collège du Pape. Upon the death of Pierre François Xavier de Ram, the bishops of Belgium chose Laforêt to succeed him in the rectorship of the university. One of his main undertakings was the foundation and organization of the schools of civil engineering, industry, and mines. He also established a new literary and pedagogical school, the Justus Lipsius Institute. Laforêt was a prothonotary Apostolic ad instar participantium, an honorary canon of the cathedral of Namur, an officer of the Order of Leopold (Belgium), a commander of the Order of Christ, a member of the Royal Academy of Belgium, and of the Roman Academy of the Catholic Religion.

== Works ==
Besides a great number of articles, especially in the "Revue catholique", Laforêt's main works are:

- "Dissertatio historico-dogmatica de methodo theologiae, sive de auctoritate Ecclesiae catholicae tanquam regula fidei christianae "(Louvain, 1849);
- "Études sur la civilisation européenne considerée dans ses rapports avec le christianisme" (Brussels, 1850);
- "La vie et les travaux d'Arnold Tits" (Brussels, 1853);
- "Principes philosophiques de la morale" (Louvain, 1852; 2nd ed., under the title "Philosophie morale", Louvain, 1855);
- "Les dogmes catholiques exposés, prouvés et vengés des attaques de l'hérésie et de l'incrédulité" (Brussels, 1855-59);
- "Pourquoi l'on ne croit pas" (Louvain, 1864; Eng. tr. "Why men do not believe", London, s. d., and new ed., New York, 1909; Germ. tr. by Vosen, "Der moderne Unglaube und seine Hauptursachen", Mainz, 1873);
- "Histoire de la philosophie" (Brussels, 1866-67), which includes only the history of ancient philosophy, the author dying before he completed the work
- "Les martyrs de Gorcum" (Louvain, 1867; Germ. tr. Münster, 1867);
- "Le syllabus et les plaies de la société moderne", a posthumous work, including the author's testament (Louvain, 1872).

Catholic Church titles
Preceded by Pierre-François de Ram	Rector of Catholic University of Leuven; 1865-1872	Succeeded by Alexandre Namèche
