= Catholic University of Leuven (1834–1968) =

Former university in Belgium

Coordinates: 50°40′11″N 4°36′44″E

- Université catholique de Louvain - Katholieke Universiteit te Leuven
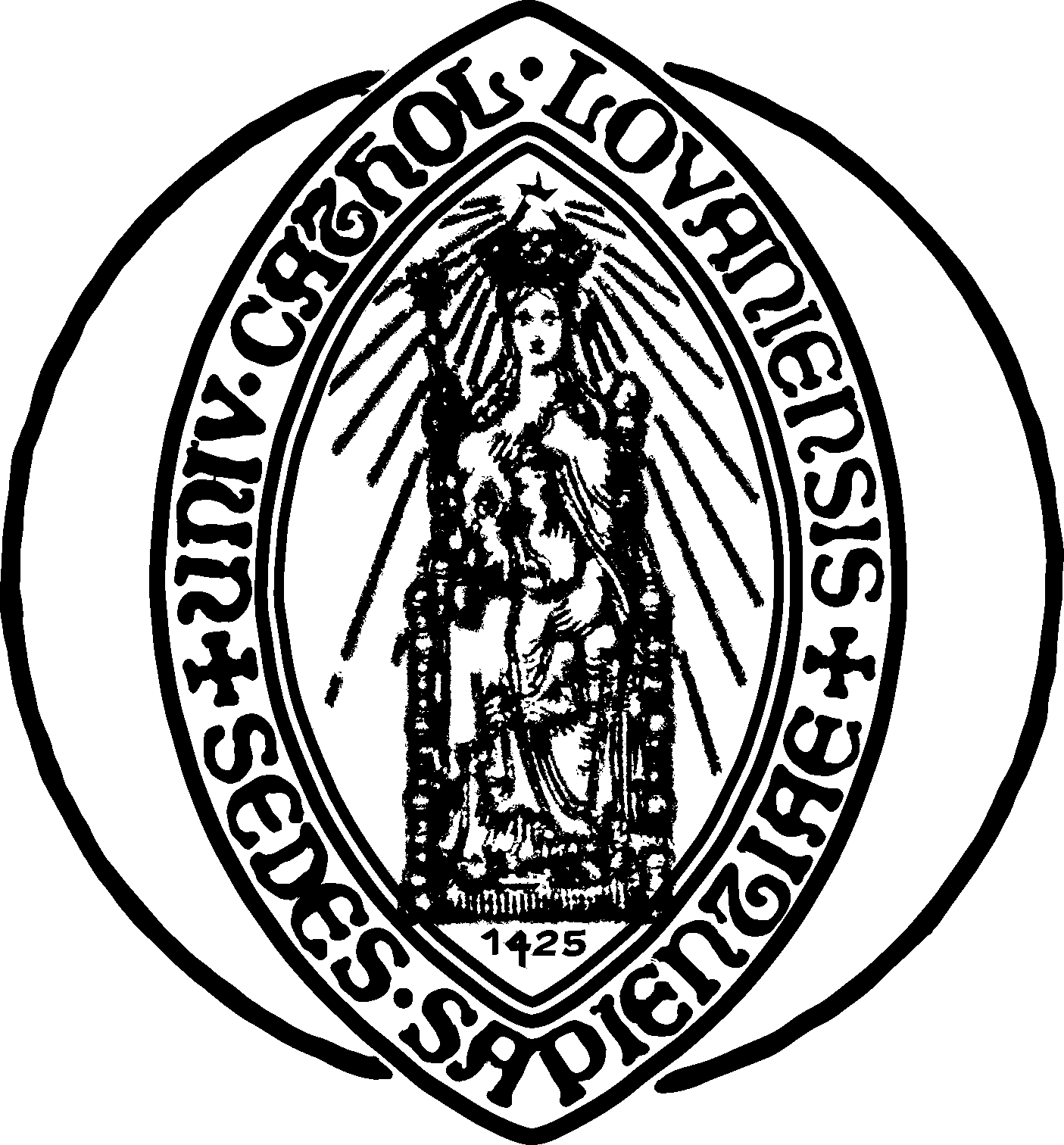
- University seal, created in 1909, depicting the Sedes Sapientiae statue in Leuven.
- Latin: Universitas Lovaniensis
- Other name: Catholic University of Louvain
- Active: 1834–1968
- Founders: The Bishops of Belgium and Pope Gregory XVI
- Religious affiliation: Roman Catholicism
- Chancellor: Engelbert Sterckx (first); Léon-Joseph Suenens (last)
- Rector: Pierre de Ram (first, 1834-1865); Albert Descamps (last, 1962-1968)
- Location: Mechelen (1834-35), Leuven (1835-), Belgium
- Campus: urban
- Language: French (1834-1969); Dutch (1930-1969); Latin (faculty of theology)

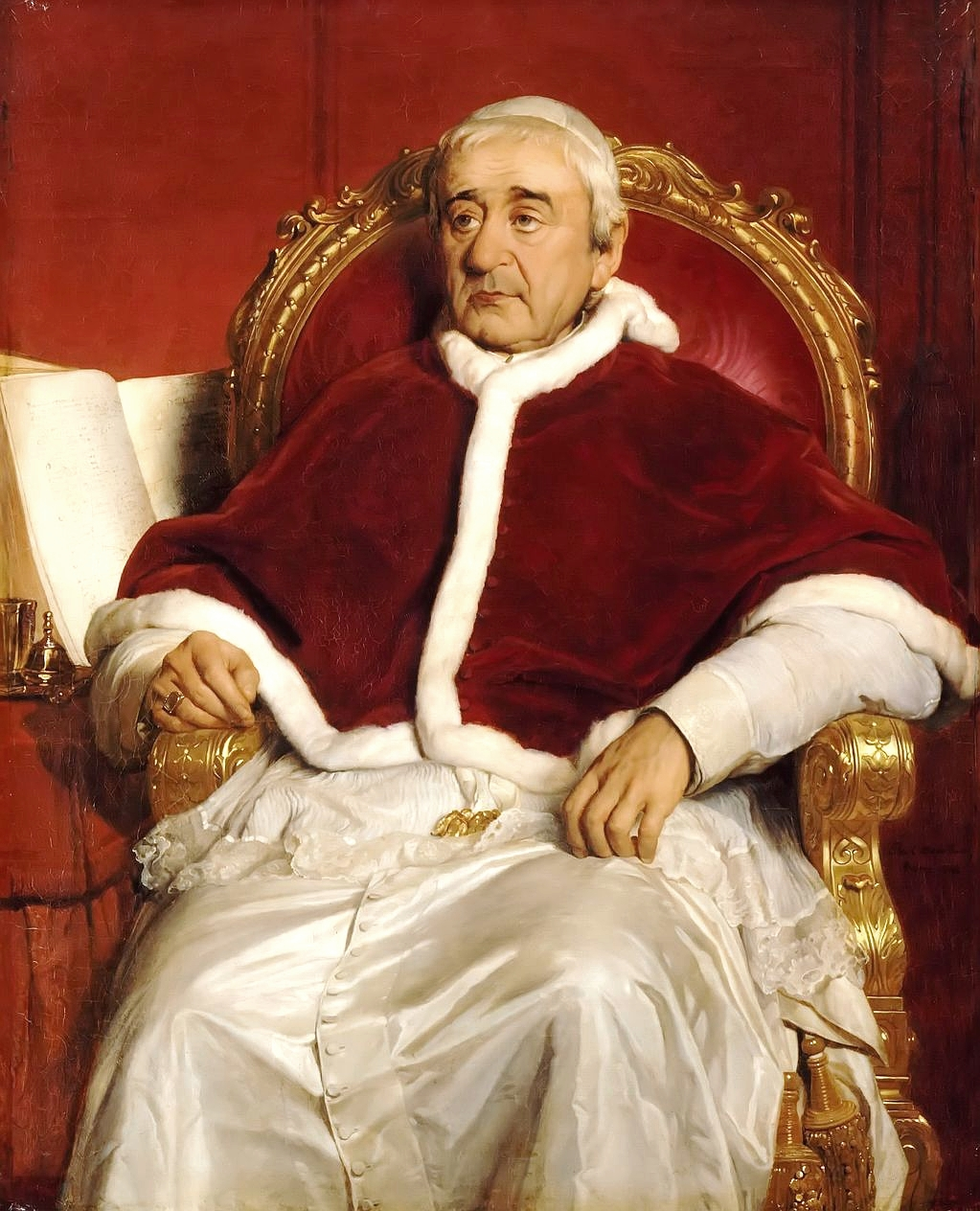
Pope Gregory XVI, co-founder in 1834 with the bishops of Belgium of the Catholic University of Malines, which would later become the Catholic University of Leuven

The Catholic University of Leuven or Louvain (Note: (French: Université catholique de Louvain, Dutch: Katholieke Hogeschool te Leuven, later Katholieke Universiteit te Leuven)) was a public university in Leuven, Belgium. It was founded in 1834 in Mechelen as the Catholic University of Belgium, and moved its seat to Leuven in 1835, changing its name to Catholic University of Leuven. In 1968, it was split into two universities, the Katholieke Universiteit Leuven and the Université catholique de Louvain, following tensions between the Dutch and French-speaking student bodies.

== History ==
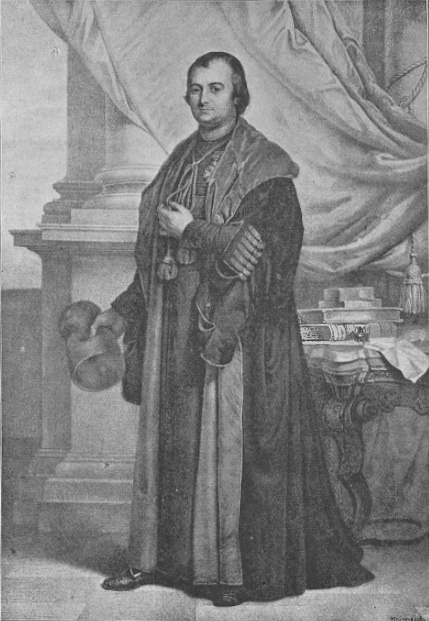
Pierre de Ram, first rector of the new Catholic University of Belgium.

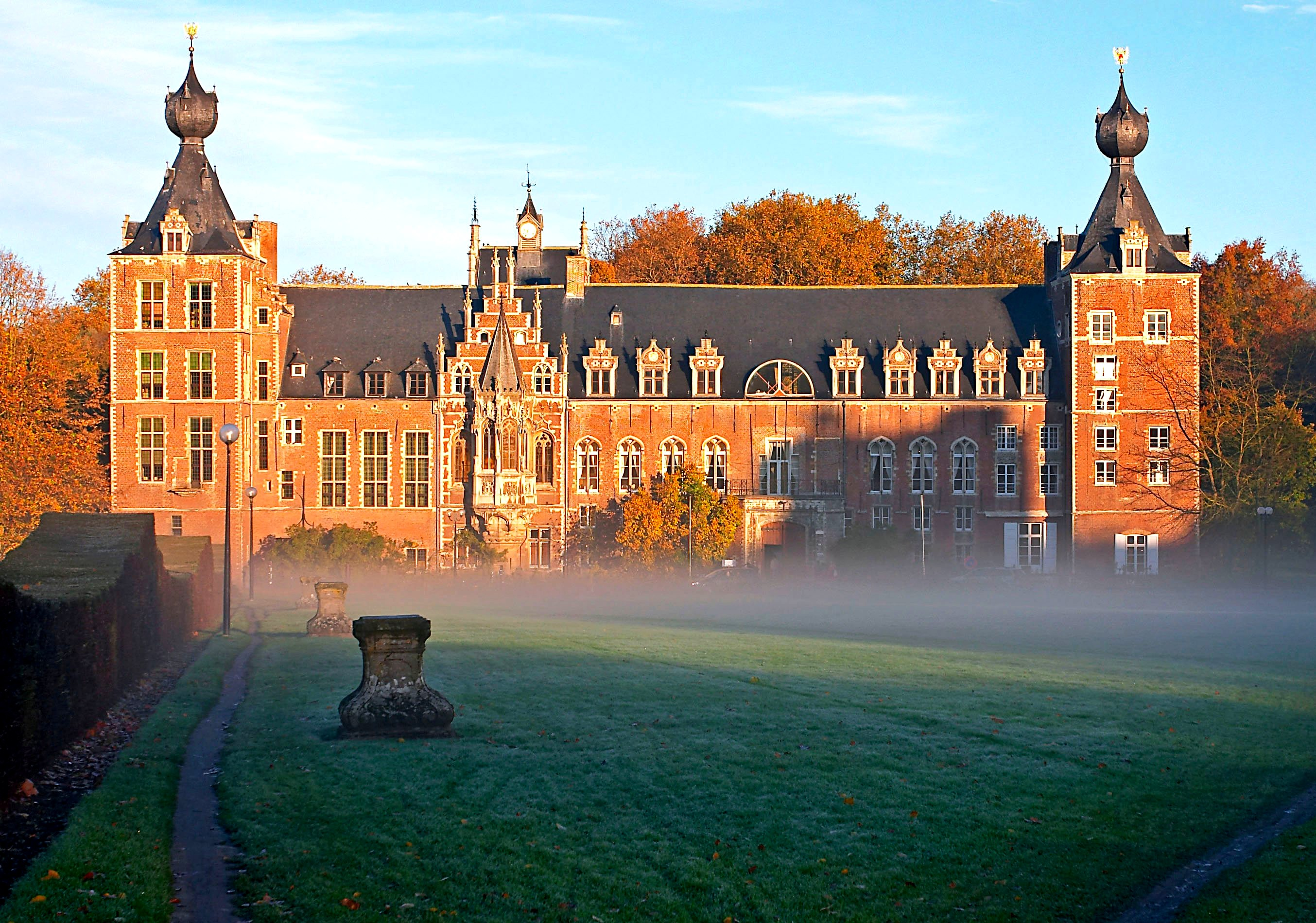
Castle Arenberg, part of the university

=== Founding in Mechelen (1834) ===
On 8 November 1834, on the basis of authorisation in a papal brief of 13 December 1833, from Pope Gregory XVI, the Belgian bishops founded the Catholic University of Belgium (Latin: Universitas catholica Belgii) in Mechelen. About this first year, it is generally referred to as "Catholic University of Mechelen". The bishops aimed to create a university "to accommodate any doctrine from the Holy Apostolic See and to repudiate anything that does not flow from this august source".

The announcement of the bishops' founding of the new university in Mechelen was met with demonstrations and disturbances in the cities of Ghent, Leuven and Liège.

The first rector was the priest and historian Pierre de Ram.

=== Move of the new university to Leuven (1835) ===
The university was short-lived in Mechelen, as the bishops already moved the university to Leuven on 1 December 1835, where it took the name "Catholic University of Leuven". This outraged Belgian liberal opinion, which depicted it as an attempt to usurp the past of the former Old University of Leuven. It also reinvigorated demands for the foundation of a secular university in Brussels which would lead to the foundation of the Free University of Brussels.

==== Previous universities in Leuven ====
An earlier University of Leuven was founded in 1425 by John IV, Duke of Brabant and chartered by a papal bull of Pope Martin V. It flourished for hundreds of years as the most prominent university in what would become Belgium, and one of the more prominent in Europe. Once formally integrated into the French Republic, the law of 15 September 1793, had decreed the suppression of all the colleges and universities in France and it was abolished by Decree of the Departement of the Dijle on 25 October 1797.

The region next became part of the United Kingdom of the Netherlands (1815–1830), and William I of the Netherlands founded a new university in 1816 in Leuven as a state university (Dutch: Rijksuniversiteit) which was a secular university and where several professors from the old university continued their teaching. In 1830, the Southern Provinces of the United Kingdom of the Netherlands became the independent state of Belgium. This university was closed in 1835.

==== Relation to the Old University of Leuven ====
With the closing of the State University of Leuven, the new Catholic University of Mechelen moved its seat to Leuven, adjusted its name and declared itself as a "re-founding" of the 1425 University of Leuven.

This claim to continuity with the older institution was challenged in the courts, with Belgium's highest court issuing rulings (in 1844, 1855 and 1861) that as a matter of law the Catholic University of Leuven was a different institution created under a different charter.

Nonetheless, the Catholic University of Leuven unofficially continued to claim to be a continuation of the older institution in Leuven, in spite of the liberal protests of the time.

=== Further history as unified institution (1835–1968) ===
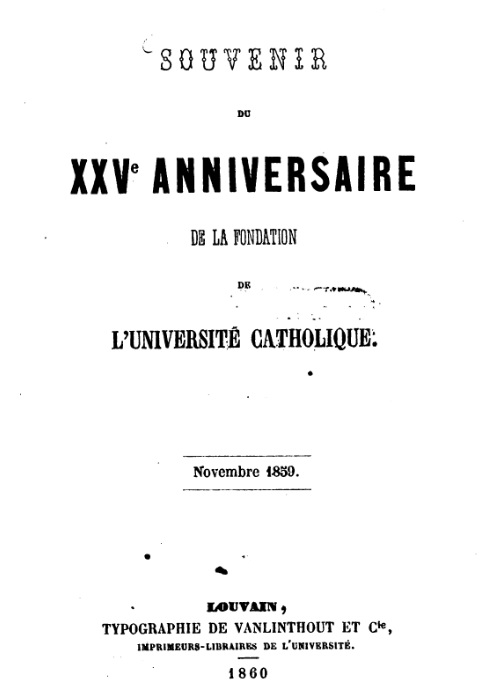
Book celebrating the 25 anniversary of the founding of the Catholic University of Louvain, November 3, 1859.

On 3 November 1859, the Catholic University celebrated the silver jubilee of its foundation. A banquet for more than five hundred guests offered by the students to the rector and the faculty, took place the 23 November 1859, in the great festival hall of the Music Academy of Louvain.

In the year 1884, the Catholic University of Louvain celebrated solemnly its 50th anniversary.

In 1909, the Catholic University celebrated its 75th anniversary, and struck a medal where for the first time it officially used the French word "réinstallation" (resettlement), and the Dutch word "herstelling" (restoration) beginning of a new "official" history.

In 1914, during World War I, Leuven was looted by German troops. They set fire to a large part of the city, effectively destroying about half of it, including the university library (see below). In the early stages of the war, Allied propaganda capitalized on the German destruction as a reflection on German Kultur.

=== Split into two officially new institutions (1962–1970) ===
From its beginning in 1834, the university provided lectures only in French. Latin was sometimes used in the theology faculty, but it was essentially a French-language institution. Lectures in Dutch, the other official language of Belgium and the language spoken in Leuven, had begun to be provided in 1930 in the Catholic University of Leuven in the meantime.

In 1962, in line with constitutional reforms governing official language use, the French and Dutch sections of the Catholic University became autonomous within a common governing structure. Flemish nationalists continued to demand a division of the university, and Dutch speakers expressed resentment at privileges given to French-speaking academic staff and the perceived disdain by the local French-speaking community for their Dutch-speaking neighbours. At the time, Brussels and Leuven were both part of the officially bilingual and now defunct Province of Brabant; but unlike Brussels, Leuven had retained its Dutch-speaking character. Tensions rose when a French-speaking social geographer suggested in a televised lecture that the city of Leuven should be incorporated into an enlarged bilingual 'Greater-Brussels' region. Mainstream Flemish politicians and students began demonstrating under the slogan Leuven Vlaams – Walen Buiten ("Leuven [is] Flemish – Walloons out"). Student demonstrations escalated into violence throughout the mid-1960s. Student unrest fueled by the history of discrimination against Flemings eventually brought down the Belgian government in February 1968.

The dispute was resolved in June 1968 by turning the Dutch-language section of the university into the independent Katholieke Universiteit Leuven, which remained in Leuven. The French-speaking university, called the Université catholique de Louvain, was moved to a greenfield campus called Louvain-la-Neuve ("New Leuven"), farther south in the French-speaking part of the Province of Brabant. Acrimony about the split was long-lasting. Currently, however, research collaborations and student exchanges between the two "sister universities" take place with increasing frequency.

== Library ==
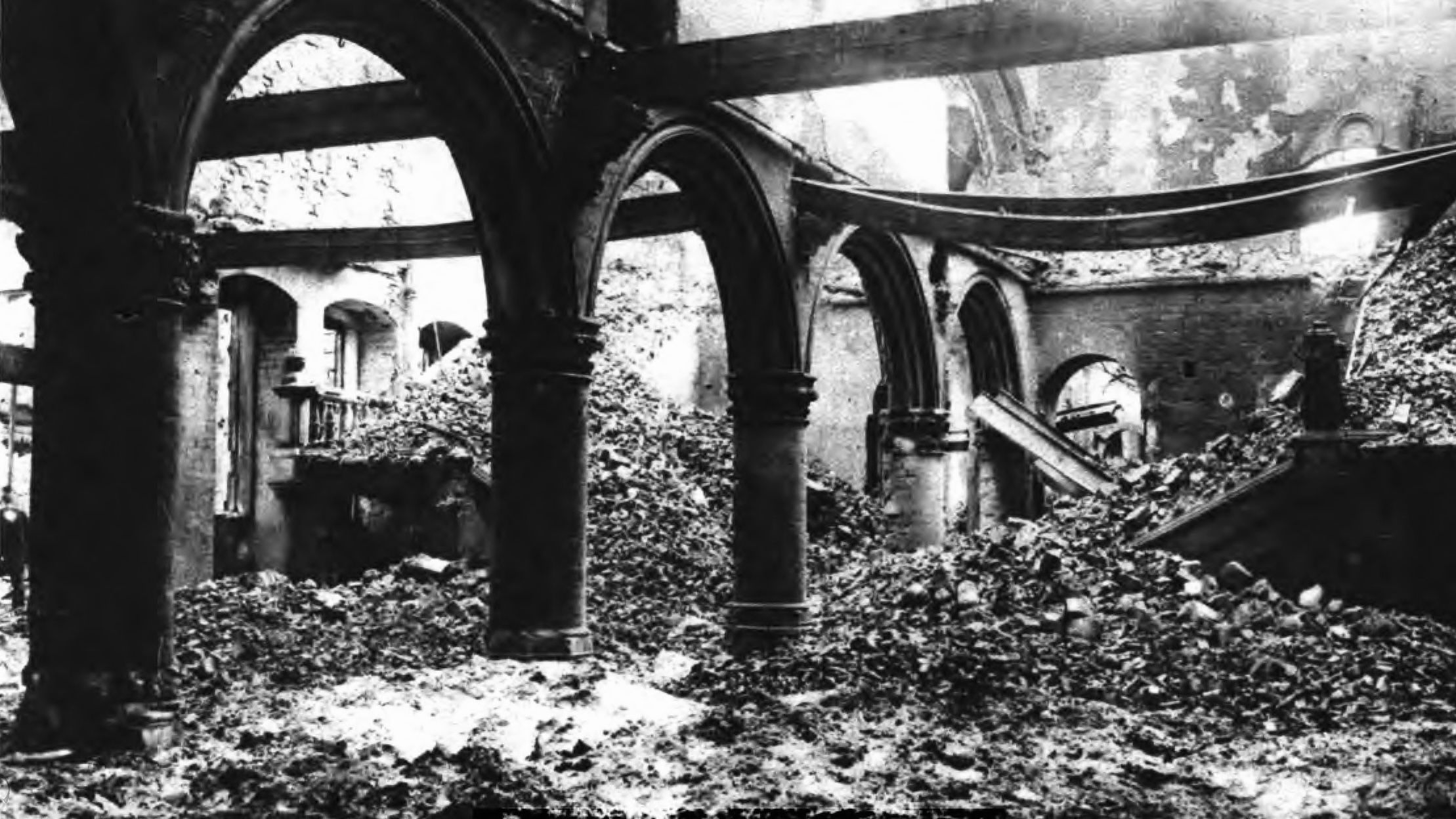
The ruins of the Catholic University of Leuven's library after it was burned by the German army in 1914

The library of the Catholic University dating from 1834 was housed in the University Hall, a building which in its oldest parts dated back to 1317. This was destroyed in August 1914 after outbreak of the First World War by invading German forces, with the loss of approximately 230,000 books, 950 manuscripts, and 800 incunabula. Materials lost included the Easter Island tablet bearing Rongorongo text E and the oldest Czech Bible.

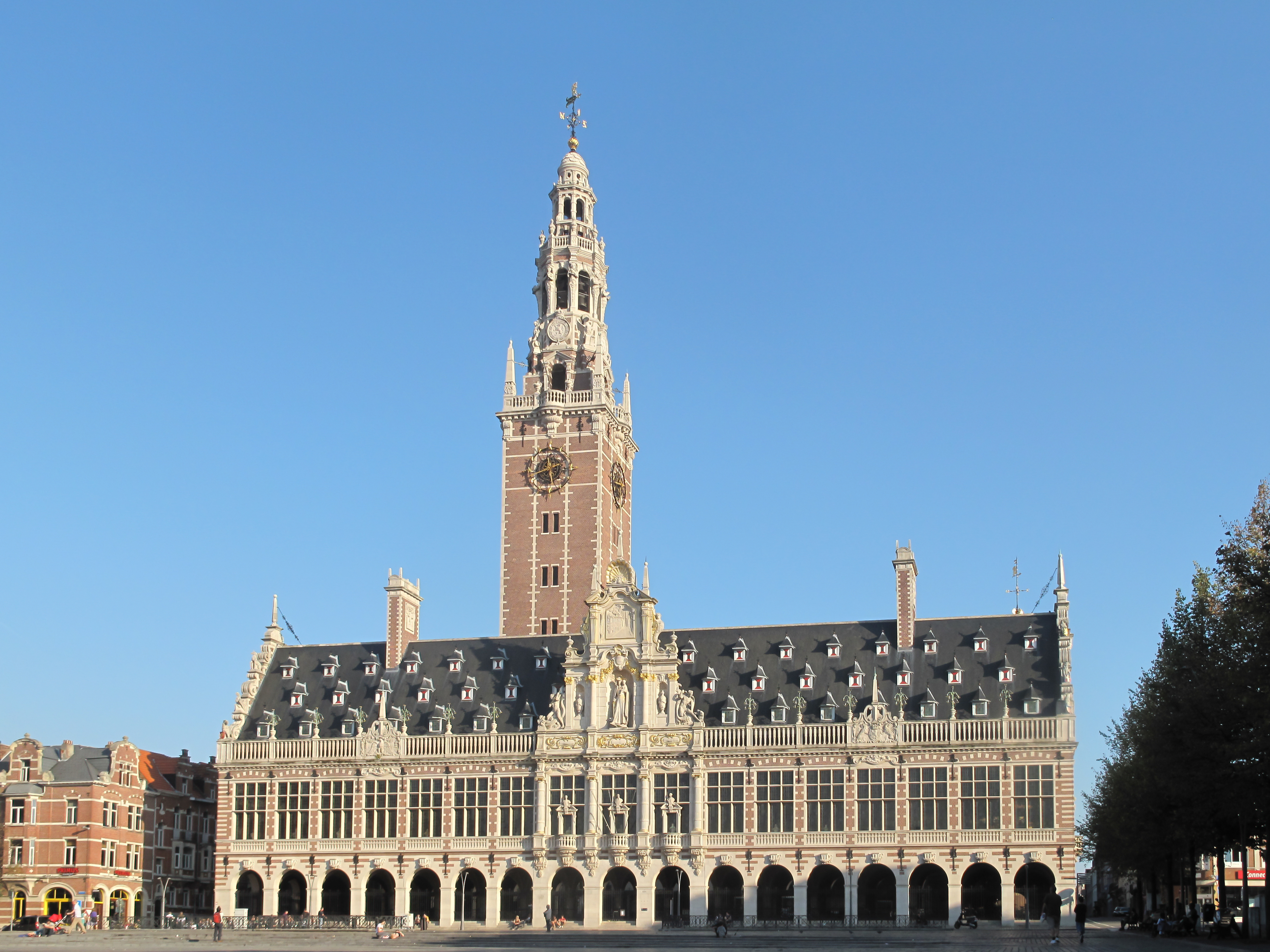
The library building designed by Whitney Warren and built from 1921 to 1928, now the KUL's central library.

After the First World War, a new library was built on the Mgr. Ladeuzeplein, designed by the American architect Whitney Warren in a neo-Flemish-Renaissance style. Construction took place between 1921 and 1928. Its monumental size is a reflection of the Allied victory against Germany, and it is one of the largest university buildings in the city. The library's collections were rebuilt with donations from all around the world, outraged by the barbaric act which it had suffered. In 1940, during the second German invasion of Leuven in World War II, the building largely burnt down, with the loss of 900,000 manuscripts and books. The building was rebuilt after the war in accordance with Warren's design.

The library's tower included a 48-bell Gillett and Johnston carillon installed in 1928, and dedicated to the memory of the engineers of the United States who died in all wars. After having fallen into complete disrepair and neglect, efforts began in the early 1980s to restore the carillon. With the cooperation of the Belgian American Educational Foundation and the university, organized efforts to restore the carillon began. The restoration fell to Eijsbouts and the bell count increased to 63. The newly restored carillon was rededicated in October 1983, with a series of lectures, concerts, statements from diplomats including Ronald Reagan, and European carillon keyboard standardization agreements.

The library's collections were again restored after the war, and by the time of the split in 1968 had approximately four million books. The separation of the university into distinct French-language and Dutch-language institutions in 1968 entailed a division of the central library holdings. This was done on the basis of alternate shelfmarks (except in cases where a work clearly belonged to one section or the other, e.g. was written by a member of faculty or bequeathed by an alumnus whose linguistic allegiance was clear). This gave rise to the factoid that encyclopedias and runs of periodicals were divided by volume between the two universities, but actually such series bear single shelfmarks.

The building on the Mgr. Ladeuzeplein is now the central library of the Katholieke Universiteit Leuven.

== Notable alumni ==
- Theodor Schwann (1810–1882), German physician and physiologist, developer of cell theory and discoverer of Schwann cells (professor).
- Louis Defré, also known as Maurice Voituron (1816–1880), Belgian lawyer and burgomaster of Uccle.
- Charles-Louis-Joseph-Xavier de la Vallée-Poussin (1827–1903), Belgian geologist and mineralogist.
- Auguste Marie François Beernaert (1829–1912), Prime Minister of Belgium and winner of the Nobel Peace Prize 1909.
- Patrick Francis Healy (1830–1910), president of Georgetown University, first Jesuit Catholic priest of African-American ancestry, first American of acknowledged African-American ancestry to earn a PhD.
- Antanas Baranauskas (1835–1902), Lithuanian poet.
- Arthur Vierendeel (1852–1940), Belgian civil engineer.
- Emile Joseph Dillon (1854–1933), Irish linguist, author and journalist.
- Albrecht Rodenbach (1856–1880), Flemish poet.
- Albin van Hoonacker (1857–1933), Belgian Catholic theologian and biblical scholar.
- Charles Jean de la Vallée-Poussin (1866–1962), Belgian mathematician who proved the prime number theorem.
- Charles Terlinden (1878—1972), Belgian historian and papal chamberlain.
- Edgar Sengier (1879–1963), Belgian mining engineer, director of the Union Minière du Haut Katanga.
- Frans Van Cauwelaert (1880–1961), Belgian politician.
- Jean-Baptiste Janssens, S.J. (1889–1964), Belgian Jesuit Catholic priest, twenty-seventh Superior General of the Society of Jesus.
- Weng Wenhao (1889–1971), Chinese geologist and politician, founder of modern Chinese geography.
- Georges Lemaître (1894–1966), Belgian astronomer, mathematician and Catholic priest, proposer of the Big Bang theory.
- Fulton J. Sheen (1895–1979), American archbishop, television evangelist, and writer.
- August De Boodt (1895–1986), Belgian politician.
- Jerome D'Souza, S.J. (1897–1977), Indian Jesuit Catholic priest, educationist, writer and member of the Indian Constituent assembly (1946–1950).
- Albert Claude (1899–1983), Belgian-American cell biologist and medical doctor, winner of Nobel Prize in Physiology or Medicine 1974.
- Peter McKevitt (1900–1976), Irish Catholic priest, author and sociologist.
- Rafael Ángel Calderón Guardia (1900–1970), physician, social reformer, President of Costa Rica (1940–1944).
- Alberto Hurtado (1901–1952), Chilean Jesuit Catholic priest, social worker and writer, canonized in 2005.
- Victor Delhez (1902–1985), Belgian engraver and artist.
- Hendrik Elias (1902–1973), Flemish nationalist and politician, quisling.
- Maurice Anthony Biot (1905–1985), Belgian–American physicist and founder of the poroelasticity theory.
- Corneille Wellens (1905–1994), Belgian engineer, administrator of societies, and olympic hockey player for Belgium.
- Léon Degrelle (1906–1994), Belgian politician and Nazi collaborator, founder of Rexism, quisling.
- Jean Charles Snoy et d'Oppuers (1907–1991), Belgian civil servant, diplomat and politician, graduated in law.
- Henri, Count of Paris (1908-1999), French Orléanist claimant to the throne of France.
- Dominique Pire (1910–1969), Belgian Dominican friar, winner of the Nobel Peace Prize 1958 for helping refugees in post-World War II Europe.
- Herman Van Breda (1911–1974), Belgian Catholic priest and philosopher, founder of the Husserl Archives.
- André Molitor (1911–2005), Belgian civil servant and private secretary of Baudouin I of Belgium, graduated in law.
- Otto von Habsburg (1912–2011), Austrian politician and writer, heir to the thrones of Austria-Hungary.
- Qian Xiuling (1912–2008), Chinese-Belgian scientist, saved nearly 100 lives during World War II.
- Tang Yuhan (1912–2014), Chinese oncologist.
- Pieter De Somer (1917–1985), Belgian physician and biologist, first rector of the Katholieke Universiteit Leuven.
- Christian de Duve (1917–2013), Belgian cytologist and biochemist, winner of the Nobel Prize in Physiology or Medicine 1974 for his discoveries concerning the structural and functional organization of the cell.
- Anton van Wilderode (1919–1998), Flemish activist and writer.
- Frans Van Coetsem (1919–2002), Flemish linguist.
- Aster Berkhof (1920-2020), Flemish writer.
- Vitold Belevitch (1921–1999), mathematician.
- Charles Mertens de Wilmars (1921–1994), Belgian psychiatrist, professor at Harvard Medical School.
- Malachi Martin (1921–1999), Irish Catholic priest, exorcist, palaeographer, and writer.
- Antoon Vergote, also known as Antoine Vergote (1921–2013), Belgian Catholic priest, theologian, philosopher, psychologist, and psychoanalyst.
- Tomás Ó Fiaich (1923–1990), Irish prelate and archbishop of Armagh, Primate of All Ireland.
- José J. Fripiat (1923–2014), Belgian scientist and chemist, 1967 laureate of the Francqui Prize.
- Michael Hurley (1923–2011), Irish Jesuit, co-founder of the Irish School of Ecumenics.
- H. Narayan Murthy (1924–2011), Indian psychologist, philosopher and scholar, known for Behaviour therapy.
- Anatole Romaniuk (1924–2018), Ukrainian demographer.
- Géza Vermes (1924–2013), British and Hungarian-Jewish biblical scholar, an expert on the Dead Sea Scrolls and the historical Jesus.
- Jan Zaprudnik (born 1926), Belarusian–American historian and poet.
- Albert Ziegler (1927-2022), Swiss theologian, ethicist and author
- Adolphe Gesché (1928–2003), Belgian Catholic priest and theologian.
- Gustavo Gutiérrez (born 1928), Peruvian Dominican friar and theologian, founder of the Liberation theology.
- Jacques Taminiaux (1928–2019), Belgian philosopher and professor, 1977 laureate of the Francqui Prize.
- Camilo Torres (1929–1966), Colombian Catholic priest, socialist and guerrillero, member of the Colombian National Liberation Army (ELN).
- Jan Vansina (1929–2017), Belgian historian of Africa and anthropologist.
- Luce Irigaray (born 1930), French philosopher, linguist, psychoanalyst, psycholinguist, cultural theorist and feminist. Graduated in 1954.
- Marcel Lihau (1931–1999), Congolese constitutionalist and politician, the first Congolese to receive a law degree.
- Father Robert S. Smith (1932–2010), American Catholic priest, author and educator.
- Herman Van Den Berghe (born 1933), Belgian geneticist, founder of the Centrum voor Menselijke Erfelijkheid (Belgian Centre for Human Heredity).
- Thomas Kanza (1933–2004), Congolese ambassador to the United Nations, one of the first Congolese university graduates.
- Pierre Laconte (born 1934), Belgian urbanist.
- Abdul Qadeer Khan (born 1936), Pakistani metallurgist considered to be the father of Pakistan's nuclear weapons program.
- Jacques van Ypersele de Strihou (born 1936), Belgian politician, Minister of State, former Chief Cabinet of Albert II and Baudouin.
- Renato Prada Oropeza (1937–2011), Mexican semiotician and writer.
- Nguza Karl-i-Bond (1938–2003), notable Zairian politician.
- Piet Van Waeyenberge (born 1938), Belgian businessman and president of De Warande, graduated in economics.
- Robert Sokolowski (born 1939), American Catholic priest and professor of philosophy at the Catholic University of America.
- Jaime Paz Zamora (born 1939), former President of Bolivia
- Erik De Clercq (born 1941), Belgian physician and biologist.
- Bernard Lietaer (born 1942), Belgian civil engineer, economist and author.
- Francis Halzen (born 1944), Belgian-American particle physicist, winner of the Nobel Physics Prize 2026
- Arthur Ulens (born 1946), Belgian businessman, graduated in chemistry and economics.
- Herman Van Rompuy (born 1947), Belgian statesman and Prime Minister of Belgium. Appointed as the first president of the European Council in November 2009.
- Bernard Le Grelle (Count) (born 1948), investigative journalist, political adviser, writer, and public affairs executive, known for his long term investigation into the JFK assassination.

== See also ==
- Academic libraries in Leuven
- Collegium Trilingue
- Katholieke Universiteit Leuven
- Leuven Database of Ancient Books
- Old University of Leuven
- State University of Leuven
- Université catholique de Louvain
- Universities in Leuven
- Lovanium University
- List of split up universities

== Bibliography ==
- Text of De Ram's inaugural speech at the opening of the University (in Latin)
- 1834: L'Ami de la religion, 1834, p. 233
- 1837: A. Ferrier, Description historique et topographique de Louvain, Bruxelles, Haumann, Cattoir et Cie, 1837.
- 1841: Augustin Theiner, Jean Cohen, Histoire des institutions d'éducation ecclésiastique, 1841, p. 112.
- 1850: Maurice Voituron, La parti libéral joué par le parti catholique dans la question de l'enseignement supérieur, Bruxelles, 1850, p. 16.
- 1860: Edward Van Even, Louvain monumental..., Louvain, C.-J. Fonteyn, 1860.
- 1864: Correspondance du R. P. Lacordaire et de Madame Swetchine, 1864, p. 26.
- 1864: Journal des économistes, Société d'économie politique of Paris, Société de statistique de Paris, 1864, p. 13.
- 1864: Louis Hymans, Histoire populaire du règne de Léopold Ier, roi des Belges, 1864, p. 154.
- 1866: Adolphe Quetelet, Sciences Mathématiques et Physiques chez les Belges au commencement du XIXe, 1866, p. 534.
- 1875: Patria Belgica, encyclopédie nationale, 1875, p. 140.
- 1881: Analectes pour servir à l'histoire ecclésiastique de la Belgique, Volume 17, 1881, p. 236.
- 1885: Edmond Henri Joseph Reusens, Documents relatifs à l'histoire de l'Université de Louvain (1425–1797), 1885, p. 228
- 1930: Georges Weill, L'éveil des nationalités: et le mouvement libéral (1815–1848), 1930, p. 181.
- 1952: Marcel Dessal, Charles Delescluze, 1809–1871: un révolutionnaire jacobin, 1952, p. 30.
- 1958: Mémoires de la Société royale des sciences de Liège, 1958, p. 89.
- 1967: L'esprit laïque en Belgique sous le gouvernement libéral doctrinaire, 1857, 1967, p. 665.
- 1974: Ruth L. White, L'Avenir de La Mennais: son rôle dans la presse de son temps, 1974, p. 173.
- 1975: Aloïs Simon, Gaston Braive, Jacques Lory, Mélanges dédiés à la mémoire de Mgr Aloïs Simon, 1975, p. 145.
- 1977: Jean Préaux, Église et enseignement, 1977, p. 177.
- 1980: Carlo Bronne, Léopold Ier et son temps, Bruxelles, éd. Paul Legrain, 1980, p. 154.
- 1981: John Bartier, Guy Cambier, Libéralisme et socialisme au XIXe siècle, 1981, p. 17.
- 1998: Astrid von Busekist, La Belgique: politique des langues et construction de l'Etat de 1780 à nos jours, 1998, p. 87.
- 1999: Véronique Laureys, L'histoire du sénat de Belgique de 1831 à 1995, 1999, p. 71.
- 2006: Jacqueline Aubenas, Suzanne Van Rokeghem, Jeanne Vercheval-Vervoort, Des femmes dans l'histoire de Belgique, depuis 1830, 2006, p. 14.
