= Rongorongo text E =

One of the undeciphered texts of Easter Island

The recto of Tablet E, Keiti

Rongorongo (/ˈrɒŋɡoʊˈrɒŋɡoʊ/; Rapa Nui: [ˈɾoŋoˈɾoŋo]) is a system of glyphs discovered in the 19th century on Easter Island that appears to be writing or proto-writing. Text E of the rongorongo corpus, also known as Keiti, is one of two dozen known rongorongo texts, though it survives only in photographs and rubbings.

== Other names ==
E is the standard designation, from Barthel (1958). Fischer (1997) refers to it as RR6.

Jaussen called it also vermoulue 'worm-eaten'.

== Location ==
Formerly in the library of the Catholic University of Leuven (Louvain), Belgium. Pinart published rubbings, which are kept in the Bancroft Library of the University of California, Berkeley.

Fischer (1997) says that the tablet survives in replicas made from casts. However, these replicas appear to have been of the Small Santiago; other than the rubbings, Keiti only survives in the two sets of photographs, one with white fill in the glyphs to make them more visible (Horley 2010).

== Description ==
Destroyed during shelling of Leuven in 1914. Originally a fluted tablet of unknown wood, 39 × 13 cm, in beautiful condition but for some small wormholes esp. on recto, upper right side.

== Provenance ==
One of Jaussen's tablets, Keiti was apparently collected on Easter Island by Fathers Roussel and Zumbohm in 1870 and sent to him in Tahiti. In 1888 Jaussen sent it to the headquarters of the Congrégation des Sacrés-Coeurs et de l'Adoration (SSCC) in Paris, with instructions to forward it to Charles-Joseph de Harlez de Deulin at the Catholic University at Louvain. It was sent in 1894, and stored in the university library, which was burnt down by the Germans in the siege of Louvain in 1914.

== Content ==
This is one of the texts Metoro Tauꞌa Ure 'read' for Jaussen. However, he read the verso upside down, included the end of line 1 as part of line 2 and read it backwards, from right to left.

== Text ==
Nine lines of glyphs recto, eight verso, for ~ 880 glyphs in all. Pozdniakov found a sequence of glyphs known from several other tablets that is split between lines Er9 and Ev1, confirming Barthel's reading order.

Line 3 of the recto terminates prematurely, with its end wedged between lines 2 and 4, as seen also on the verso of Aruku.

Barthel

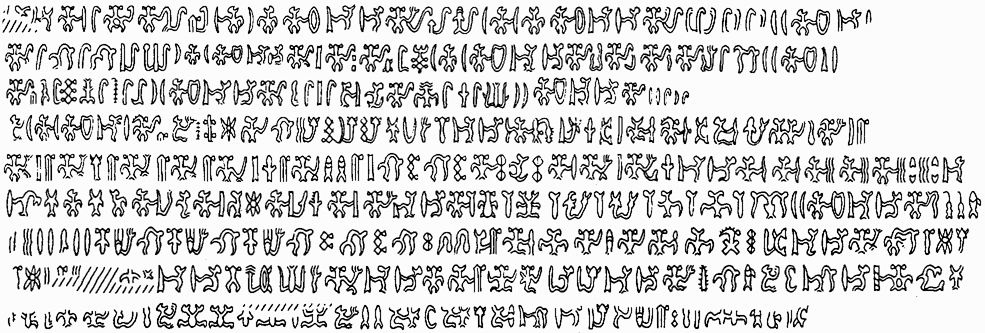
Recto, as traced by Barthel. The lines have been rearranged to reflect English reading order: Er1 at top, Er9 at bottom.
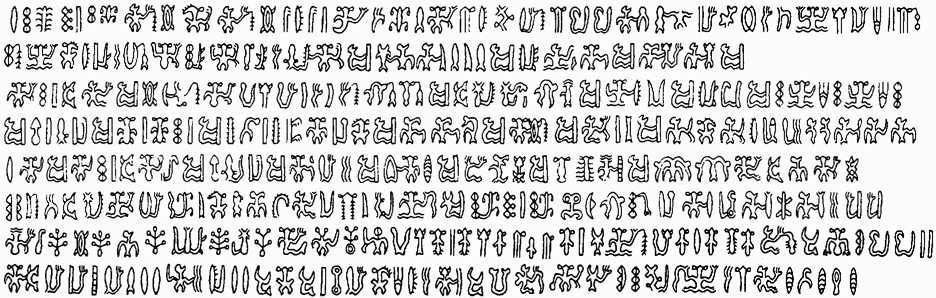
Verso, as traced by Barthel: Ev1 at top, Ev8 at bottom.

Fischer

== Image gallery ==
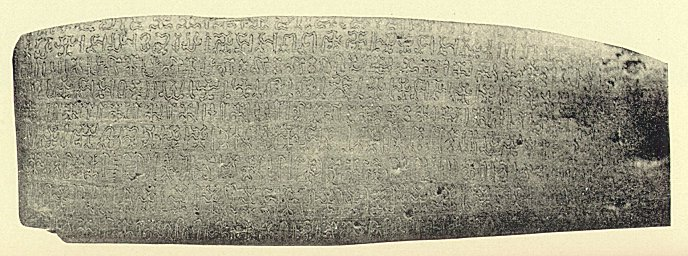
Recto (copy of original print)

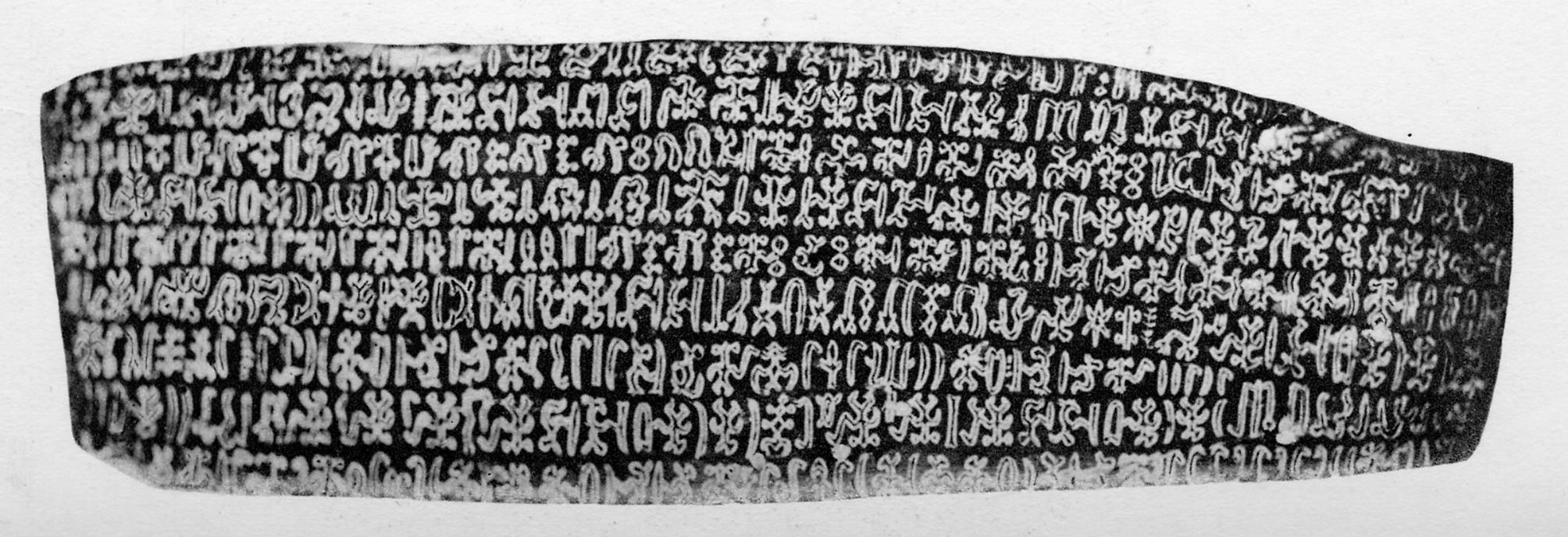
Recto with white fill

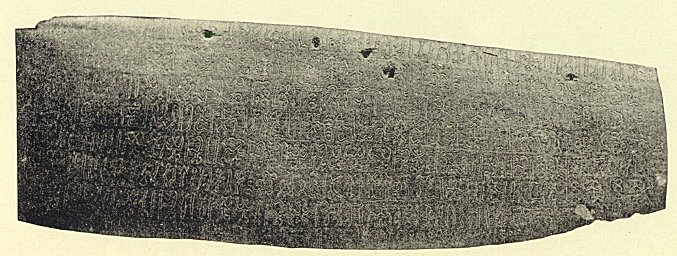
Verso (copy of original print)

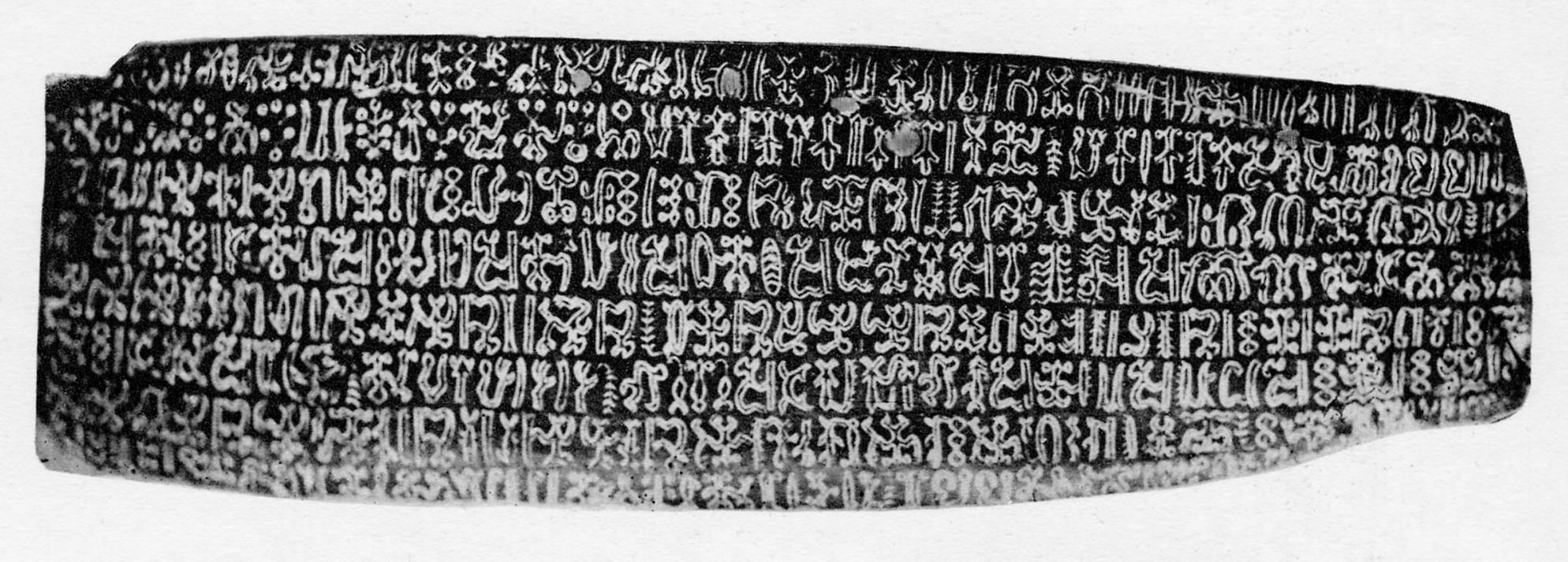
Verso with white fill
