= Louis Defré =

Belgian politician and lawyer (1816–1880)

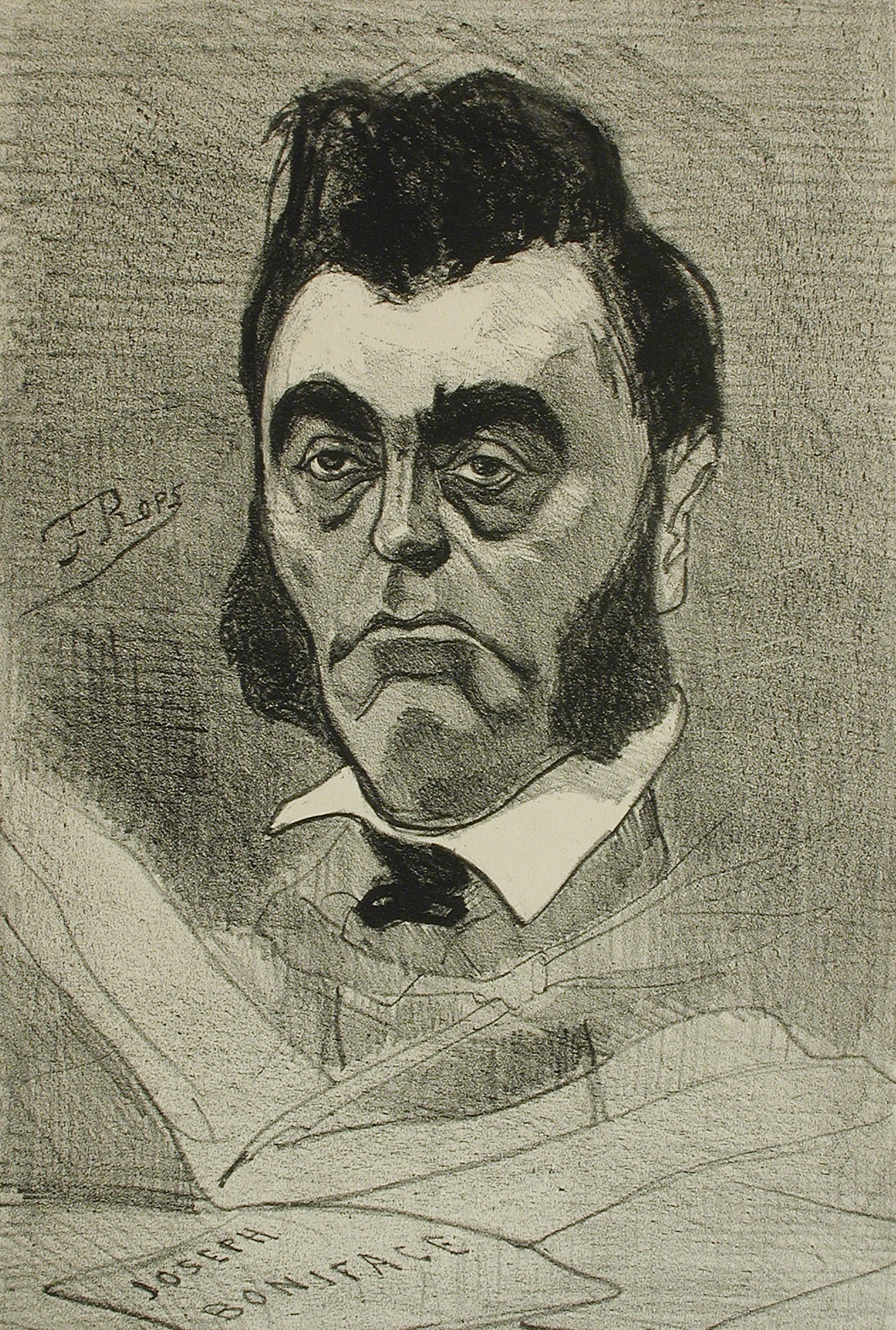
Louis Defré, burgomaster of Uccle, lithography by Félicien Rops.

Louis Defré (1816–1880), was a burgomaster mayor of Uccle, Belgium, from 1864 to 1872, and deputy

== Biography ==
Louis Defré, was raised in a rigid catholic family and environment, and he studied at the new founded Catholic University of Leuven.

He became in 1839 lawyer, and a member of the House of Representatives.

Under the pseudonym of Maurice Voituron or Joseph Boniface he wrote pamphlets against the clericalism, the Catholic intolerance and the power of the Church in Belgium.

In his honor, his name was given to an avenue of Uccle, the "Avenue De Fré".

== Publications ==
- Influence épiscopale: Réponse à M. Prosper Cornesse, ministre de la justice par Louis de Fré, Brussels, 1871.

== Publications under the pseudonym of Maurice Voituron ==
- Le Parti libéral joué par le Parti catholique, dans la question de l'enseignement supérieur ou Ce que coûte aux contribuables l'Université cléricale de Louvain : épitre à Mgr. De Ram, Brussels by Périchon, 1850.

== Publications under the pseudonym Joseph Boniface ==
- De l'influence du dogme catholique sur la politique nationale, Brussels, 1855.
- L'intolérance catholique et les lettres pastorales, Brussels, 1857.
- Tiel Uylenspiegel patriote, Brussels, 1860.
- Biographie anecdotique, par un ami d'enfance, Brussels, 1881.

== Bibliography ==
- J. Francis, Uccle et ses bourgmestres, Bruxelles, 1979, pp. 179–182.
- Pol Delfosse, Dictionnaire historique de la laïcité belge.
- Jean-Luc De Paepe and Christiane Raindorf-Gérard, Le Parlement belge, 1831-1894. Données biographiques, Brussels, 1996.
