= Rongorongo text T =

One of the undeciphered texts of Easter Island

Text T of the rongorongo corpus, also known as Honolulu tablet 1 or Honolulu 3629, is the only fluted tablet in the Honolulu collection and one of two dozen surviving rongorongo texts.

== Other names ==
T is the standard designation, from Barthel (1958). Fischer (1997) refers to it as RR11.

== Location ==
Bernice P. Bishop Museum, Honolulu. Catalog # B.03629.

== Description ==
A broken, decayed piece of a tablet, 31 × 12.5 × 2.5 cm of unknown wood. There are faint ridges, perhaps the remnants of fluting. It has been heavily damaged by moisture, fire, and insects on both sides, but with more water damage on side b, as well as splitting and a long gouge down the center. Métraux (1938) said of the Honolulu tablets T and U that,

Probably these tablets were kept for some time in a cave, and the side lying on the ground was greatly injured by the damp soil.

He was of the opinion that T had once been a fine artifact:

The same skill and the same vigour of design, which made the best tablets of Easter Island real works of art, characterise the execution of this tablet.

== Provenance ==
Collector J. L. Young of Auckland purchased three of the Honolulu tablets circa 1888 "from Rapanui through a reliable agent", who Fischer (1997) thinks was probably Alexander Salmon, Jr. It was transferred to the Bishop Museum in August 1920.

== Content ==
Ta is the only text, apart from the single line of Gv which Butinov and Knorozov suggested might be a genealogy, that parallels the glyph triplets of the Staff (Pozdniakov 1996). It is the only other text that includes line breaks (one in Ta4 and another in Ta7) which dominate the Santiago Staff.

== Text ==
Despite its condition, this is the best preserved of the Honolulu tablets. Side a has eleven lines, of which nine with some 150 glyphs are visible, out of an original somewhere around 400.

Side b is illegible. Fischer (1997) made pencil rubbings of this side, but the results were too faint to be legible. He suggests that electronic scanning techniques might be able to retrieve some of the text.

Barthel

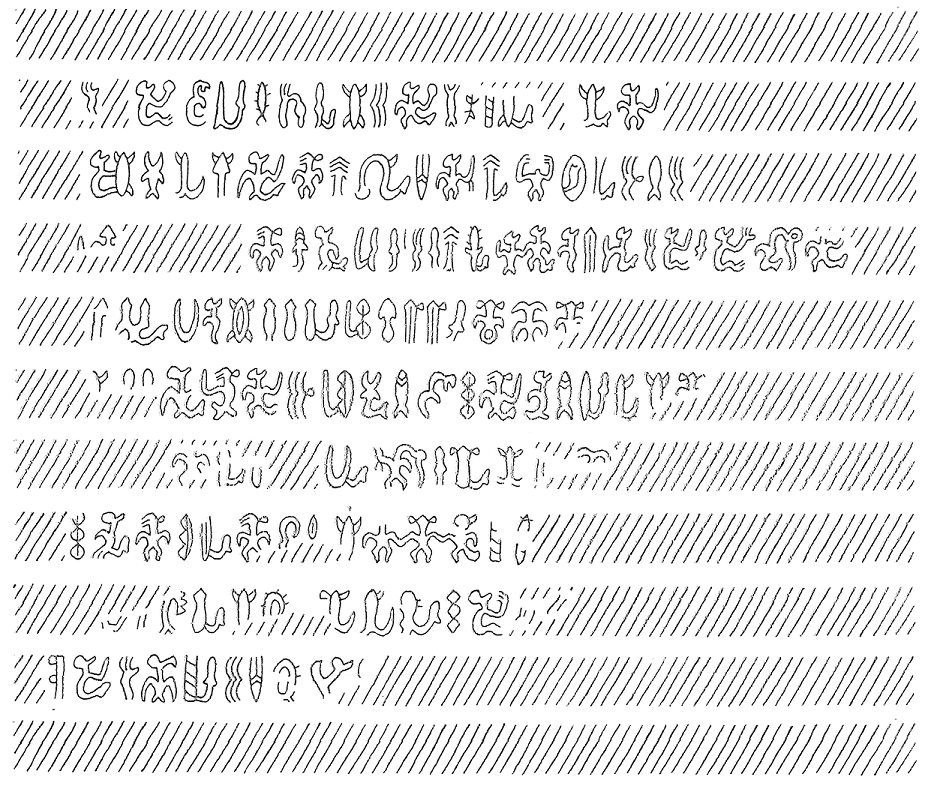
Side a, as traced by Barthel. The lines have been rearranged to reflect English reading order: Ta1 at top, Ta11 at bottom.

Fischer
