= Rongorongo text I =

One of the undeciphered texts of Easter Island

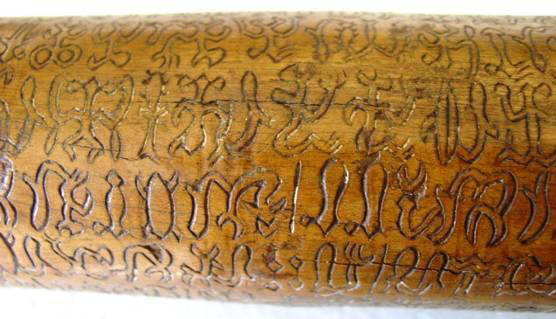

Text I of the rongorongo corpus, also known as the Santiago Staff, is the longest of the two dozen surviving rongorongo texts. Statistical analysis suggests that its contents are distinct from those of the other texts.

== Other names ==
I is the standard designation, from Barthel (1958). Fischer (1997) refers to it as RR10.

== Location ==
Museo Nacional de Historia Natural, Santiago. Catalog # 5.499 (316).

There are reproductions at the Institut für Völkerkunde, Tübingen (prior to 1989); Bishop Museum, Honolulu; Musées Royaux de Bruxelles, Belgium (as of 2008 temporarily housed in the Musée du Malgré Tout in Treignes); and in Steven Fischer's personal collection in Auckland.

== Physical description ==
The 126-cm long staff is entirely covered with glyphs running along its length. It is round in cross-section, 5.7 cm in diameter at one end and 6.4 cm at the other (per Fischer; length 126.6 cm and circumferences at extremities of 17.1 and 20.0 cm per Bettocchi), and made of unknown wood. It is in good condition, but with some splitting, and it is battered on one side of the thick end, evidently from resting diagonally on the ground when held. There is some pitting just below the start of line 12 (Fischer's line 1), which Fischer believes may be due to corrosion from the sebum of the bearer's thumb.

This is widely thought to be one of the finest rongorongo inscriptions. Fischer writes The scribe displays the same expertise as the scribe of side a of "Échancrée", and Barthel that The creator must have been a master of his discipline.

== Provenance ==
The Staff was presented to the officers of the Chilean corvette O'Higgins in 1870 by the French colonist Dutrou-Bornier, who claimed that it had belonged to an ꞌariki (king). At that point it disappeared, but in 1876 it was given to the director of the Museo Nacional de Historia Natural, Rudolf Philippi.

This is the only incised kouhau (staff) that remains, the sole remnant of a corpus once as numerous as the tablets.

== Contents ==
Dutrou-Bornier thought that the Staff was a weapon and had belonged to an ꞌariki. When Anacleto Goñi, the commander of the O'Higgins, asked the Rapanui people its significance, he reported that he was,

shown the sky and the hieroglyphs that [the staff] contained with such respect that I was inclined to believe that these hieroglyphs recalled something sacred. (Philippi 1875:676, translation by Fischer 1997)

Pozdniakov (1996:290, 299) notes that the Staff shares short phrases with texts Gv and T (or at least Ta), but has nothing in common with the rest of the rongorongo corpus.

The Staff provided the basis of Steven Fischer's attempted decipherment, which is widely known through his book, but which has not been accepted by others in the field. Fischer believes the Staff consists exclusively of creation chants in the form of "all the birds copulated with the fish; there issued forth the sun". The sign which Fischer translates as 'copulate', 76, a putative phallus, occurs 564 times on the Staff.

Guy (1998) argues that this is untenable, and further that if Butinov and Knorozov are correct about a genealogy on Gv, then Fischer's putative phallus is a patronymic marker, and the Staff would consist almost entirely of personal names. Fischer's creation chant given above might instead "Son of (bird) was killed", since the fish was used metaphorically for a war victim. (The kohau îka "lines of fish" rongorongo were lists of persons killed in war.) The Staff would more likely be a list of battles and of their heroes and victims.

== Text ==
There are thirteen full and one partial line, containing ~ 2,320 glyphs per Fischer. As of April 2008, the CEIPP counted 2208 legible glyphs, 261 indistinct or partially legible glyphs, and estimated that 35 glyphs had been effaced.

Although the direction of reading has been determined, the point where the text starts has not. Philippi's line numbers were arbitrary, but kept by Barthel. The main asymmetry is that line 12 (Fischer's line 1) is 90 cm long, running three quarters the length of the Staff. The space occupied by lines 12 and 13 is 30 mm wide at the thick end of the staff (at the end of line 12 and beginning of line 13), but only 17 mm wide at the tapered end (at the end of line 13). Past the cut-off point (the beginning) of line 12, the baseline of line 13 shifts upward, and the glyphs widen to fill in the gap. From that point on, 13 is parallel with line 11 rather than antiparallel as is normally the case for adjacent lines.

Fischer takes the short line 12 to be the beginning of the text, reasoning that it would have been easier to indent the first line than to estimate how long the last line would be when fitting it in, and that the large glyphs in line 13 past the end of line 12 were written that way to fill in the gap. However, he does note that there are remnants of pre-inscription tracings that would have enabled such an estimate. Horley (2011) makes a case that 12 was the last line: That the text starts at line 11, wraps around (in descending order) to 13, and that 12 was fit into the gap between the slightly skew lines 11 and 13. The way lines 12 and 13 squeeze together (the glyphs are 12–14 mm high at the thick end of the staff, but only 8–10 mm high at the end of line 12 where 13 takes over) is consistent with these being the last lines engraved.

The Staff is one of only two rongorongo texts inscribed with vertical bars (|), 103 of them (there are also a few in text T), which Fischer believes divided the text into sections.

Fischer (1997) writes,

Much thin outlining of glyphs, using obsidian flakes, was subsequently covered with other glyphs using a shark's tooth, leaving the traces of the unused outlines.

Barthel

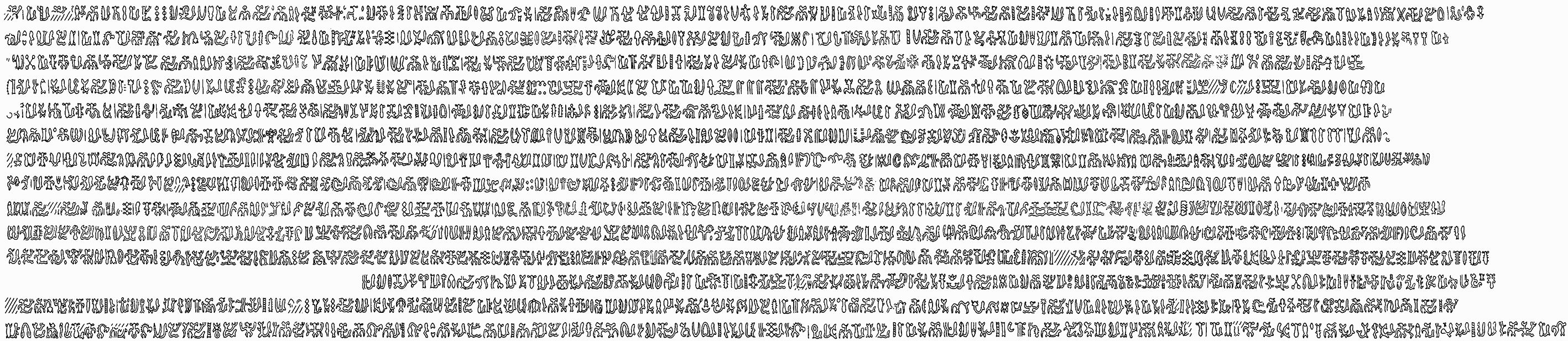
The text as traced by Barthel. Barthel's lines have been rearranged to all be right-side up, I1 at top, I14 at bottom, though this is not likely to reflect the reading order of the Staff. Horley argues that the text begins at 11 (lower left corner above the gap), reads upward, and finishes (left to right) with short line 12
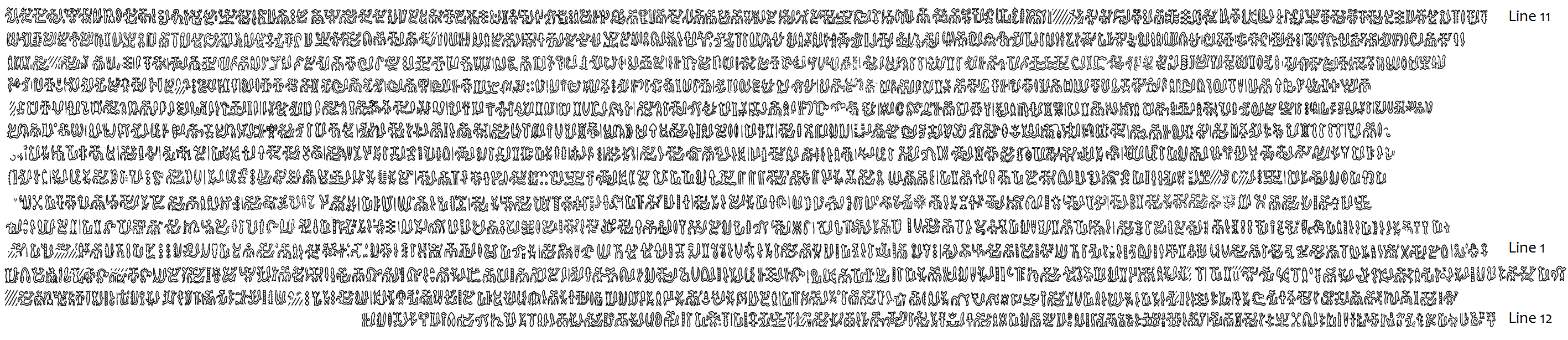
The Barthel text, reordered to reflect the readings of Horley

Fischer

Fischer renumbered the lines, shifting them by upward by a count of three, with Philippi's line 12 as his line 1. He made at least one obvious error in his transcription, with the very first glyph:

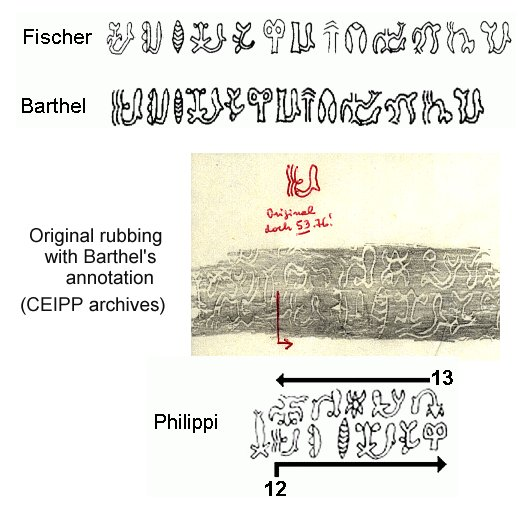
Fischer and Barthel disagree on the first glyph of line 12. Barthel's original rubbing confirms his version. Note that the palm tree (glyph 67, here upside-down at the left of Philippi's drawing and to the left of the red line in Barthel's rubbing) and subsequent glyphs (three-quarters of the way through Barthel's line 13) fill in the gap left by the short line 12.

== Image gallery ==
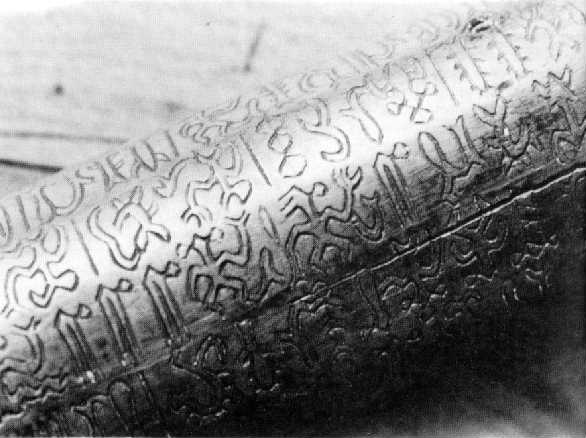
A section of lines 2-6, centered on 4 (glare is along line 5).

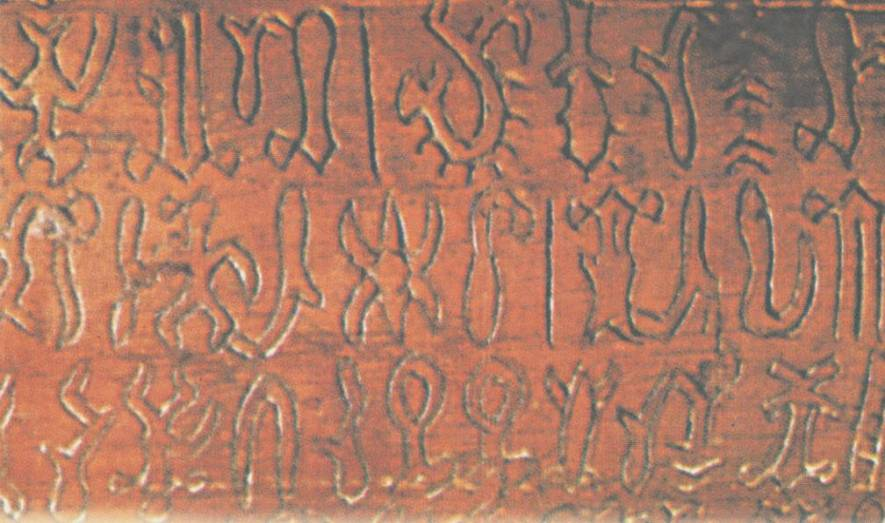
A section, color, of lines 1 (bottom) to 3 (top).

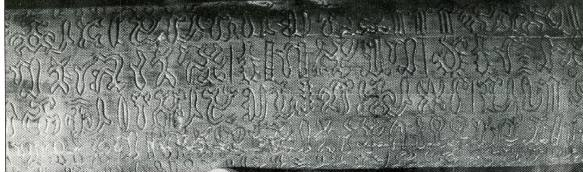
A section of lines 1 (bottom) to 3 (top). Line 14 is half-visible along bottom edge.
