= Rongorongo text K =

One of the undeciphered texts of Easter Island

Text K of the rongorongo corpus, also known as the (Small) London tablet, is one of two dozen surviving rongorongo texts. It nearly duplicates the recto of tablet G.

== Other names ==
K is the standard designation, from Barthel (1958). Fischer (1997) refers to it as RR19.

== Location ==
British Museum, London. Catalog # AOA 1903–150.

There are reproductions in the British Museum; Musée de l'Homme, Paris; and the Chilean National Museum of Natural History, Santiago.

== Physical description ==
A small tablet, not fluted, of Pacific rosewood (Orliac 2005), 22 × 6.8 × 1.8 cm. One end is chipped off, but no glyphs are missing. However, there appears to have been reworking, with the glyphs of line r5 planed off and the adjacent line v1 cut into the planed edge. Fischer also notes underlying hair-line glyphs which suggest to him that K may be a palimpsest. The later, deeper cuts may have been made with a steel blade. These glyphs are rather crude, of about the quality of side b of Echancrée.

The tablet appears to be worn and polished from handling; however, as it appears from rot and worm holes to have lain for a time in wet soil (perhaps a cave), the polish must be due to subsequent handling, perhaps with its European owners.

== Provenance ==
Although its provenance is not well documented, and therefore suspect, Fischer believes that the London tablet may be the youngest authentic inscription that has survived.

Dalton (1904) writes that he purchased the tablet in an antique store in London's dock district in about the year 1900. It was "said to have been in the family of its recent owner more than thirty years; if the statement is correct, it must have been among the first of its class to reach Europe". It may have been part of one of several lost collections of tablets. Dalton presented it to the British Museum on 25 November 1903.

Métraux thought at first that the London tablet was a forgery, due to the engraving being of the poor quality seen in modern carvings for tourists. However, after he had a chance to see it in person, and after Barthel declared it authentic, his 'skepticism was dispelled' (1957:184). The evidence is principally the paraphrasing rather than copying of text Gr, which would have required literacy in the script to accomplish.

Fischer (1997) agrees with Métraux and Barthel that tablet K is recent. He believes that it was carved "just before the cessation of rongorongo production in the 1860s", in the period of decline that followed the death of ꞌariki Ngaꞌara in circa 1859.

A figure of the recto reproduced in Routledge (1919:Fig. 98) served as a model for copies sold to tourists on Easter Island in the 1920s and 1930s. Many of these are on display in the world's museums as authentic.

== Contents ==
The London tablet contains the text of the first seven lines of the Small Santiago tablet, although as a paraphrase rather than a direct copy. Because of the frequent repetition of glyph 380.1, which he interpreted as a tangata rongorongo (rongorongo chanter) with a kouhau (staff), Barthel (1958:310) believed K was a catalog of other kohau rongorongo texts. Fischer also believes it to be a list of some kind, and notes that the simplicity of the repeated glyph on this recent tablet, compared to 380.1+3 of G and 380.1+52 of N, suggests a compositional simplification over time. However, the two patterns are mixed on some tablets.

== Text ==
There are five lines of glyphs on the recto, a transitional line (Kv1) along the edge, and four lines (Kv2-5) on the verso proper. The first and last lines (Kr1 and Kv5) are mostly obliterated. There remain 250 glyphs out of an original ~ 290. As text K is a near copy of Gr, the reading order is established.

The prototypical pictograph of a bird, glyph 600, which looks like a frigatebird on older rongorongo texts such as G, here has a different head, resembling in Fischer's opinion the sooty tern. Fischer notes that the last Birdman competitions sought the egg of the sooty tern rather than the traditional frigatebird, which by then had been hunted out.

Barthel

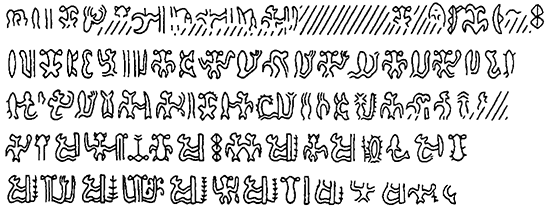
Recto, as traced by Barthel. The lines have been rearranged to reflect English reading order: Kr1 at top, Kr5 at bottom.

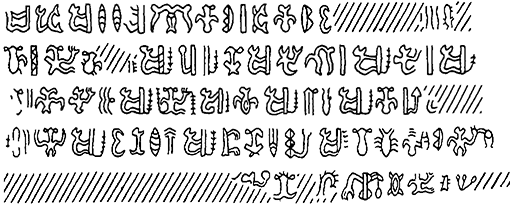
Verso, with Kv1 at top, Kv5 at bottom.

Fischer

== Image gallery ==
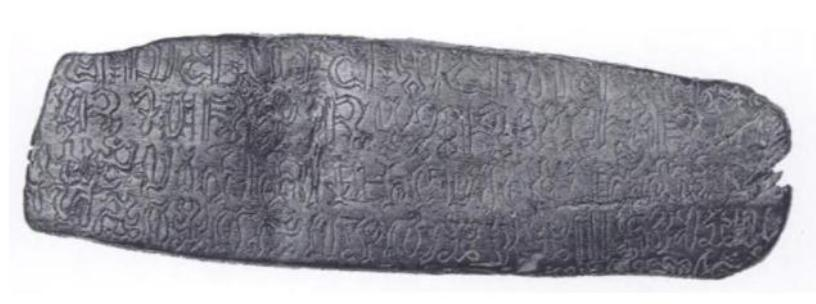
Recto, B&W

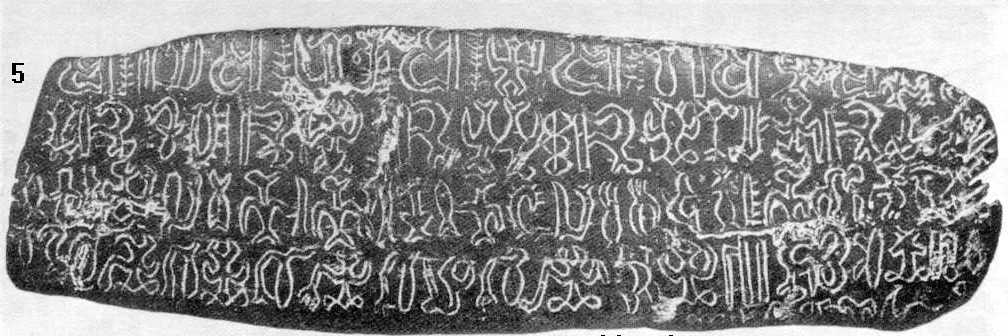
Recto, negative

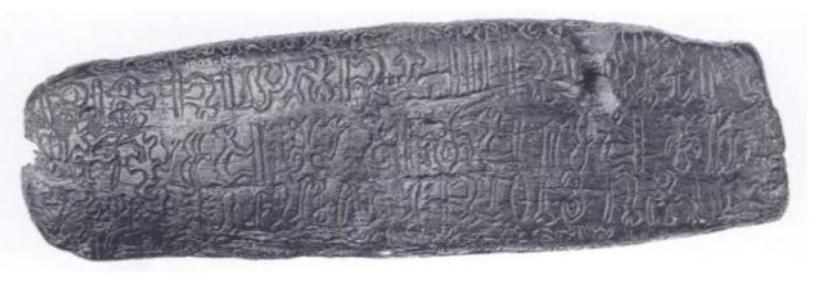
Verso, B&W

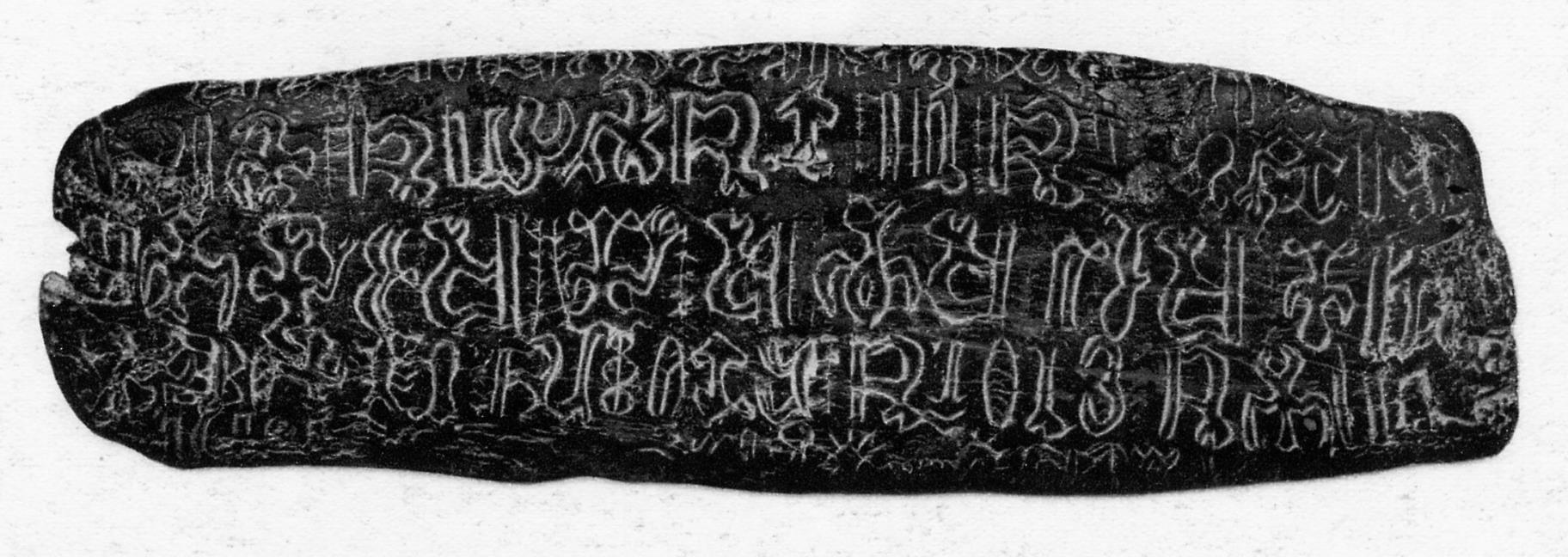
Verso, negative

Edge, with text continuing from recto to verso
