= Pierre François Xavier de Ram =

Belgian historian

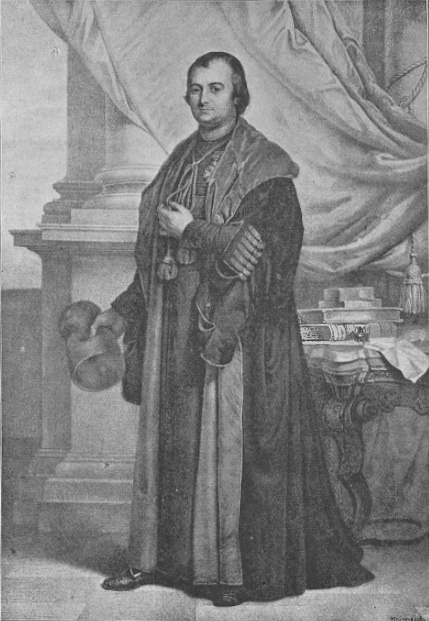
Monseignor Peter de Ram, the first rector of the Catholic University of Mechlin and in 1835 the first rector the new Catholic University of Leuven.

Pierre François Xavier de Ram (September 2, 1804, Leuven – May 14, 1865, Leuven), was a Belgian papal prelate, canon and historian, best known for being the first rector of the Catholic University of Leuven.

== Biography ==
De Ram entered the Major Seminary, Mechelen, where he was ordained in 1827. He was appointed professor of poetry at the seminary of Mechelen and archivist of the diocese.

During the period when King William I was carrying on his campaign against the Catholic faith and traditions of the Belgians, and while de Ram was still young, he took an active part in the struggle maintained by the Belgian clergy against the government of the Netherlands, republishing eighteenth century works, in which, in a series of historical studies refuting the doctrines of Joseph II, he combatted the latter's disciple, King William I.

He was next appointed keeper of the diocesan records and professor in the episcopal seminary at Mechelen. In order to stay the spread of Protestantism in the Netherlands he collaborated with a movement for the publishing of religious works, bringing out Levens van de voornaemste Heyligen en roemweerdige peersonen der Nederlanden (Lives of the most prominent saints and celebrities of the Netherlands). His chief study for many years was hagiography, and he published an edition of Alban Butler's Lives of the Saints (Leuven, 1828–35). Between 1828 and 1858 appeared the Synodicon Belgicum, a collection of unpublished documents upon the ecclesiastical history of the Netherlands since Philip II (Leuven, 4 vols., in quarto).

During the years immediately before the Revolution of 1830, de Ram, who was much influenced by Lamennais, was active in bringing about a coalition of Liberals and Catholics against the government of the United Kingdom of the Netherlands established by the Treaty of Vienna (1815) after the fall of Napoleon, and in endeavouring to give a democratic character to the policy of his church. He declined to stand as a member of the Belgian assembly, and applied himself wholly to teaching and to editing or composing historical books.

De Ram was an active member of Royal Academies for Science and the Arts of Belgium and a foreign associate of the Bavarian Academy of Sciences and Humanities. When the monumental project of the Acta Sanctorum, interrupted in 1794, was resumed by the New Bollandists in 1838, De Ram, who as a young man had bought the whole series of Bollandist publications – at that time 53 volumes in folio – was considered as a possible member of the board of editors. While not joining the project, he gave his expert opinion to the Commission royale d'histoire warmly recommending support of the endeavour.

As professor of philosophy at Mechelen he succeeded in bringing about the foundation of the Catholic University of Belgium there in 1834. This new university was only briefly in Mechelen, moving to Leuven on 1 December 1835, where it took the name Catholic University of Leuven. This led to consternation among Belgian anti-clericals, who were afraid that this new university, by usurping the name of the Old University of Leuven, was manoeuvering to claim its former scholarship foundations. It also reinvigorated demands for the foundation of a secular university in Brussels which would lead to the creation of the Free University of Brussels.

De Ram remained rector of the Catholic University until his death in 1865.

== Honours ==
- Protonotarius Apostolicus
- Knight of the Order of Leopold 14 December 1838, Officier on 9 August 1855
- Officier of the Order of the Oak Crown.
- Encomienda of the Order of Isabella the Catholic, 9 June 1851
- Knight of the Order of Saint Hubert, Bavaria, 3 May 1895
- Knight of the Order of the Red Eagle, 2 August 1853
- Commandor of the Supreme Order of Christ, 5 August 1854
- Knight of the Saxe-Ernestine House Order, 12 August 1854
- member of the Royal Academie, 15 December 1837

== Sources ==
Catholic Church titles
Preceded by New Creation	Rector of Catholic University of Leuven; 1835–1865	Succeeded by Nicholas-Joseph Laforêt
