= Adolphe Gesché =

Belgian Catholic priest and theologian

Adolphe Gesché (25 October 1928 – 30 November 2003) was a Belgian Catholic priest and theologian. He was professor of Dogmatic Theology at the Faculty of Theology of the Catholic University of Louvain and author of several works in the field of Theological studies.

== Biography ==
Born in Brussels to Catholic parents who were open to ideas of plurality, Gesché went to school at the Collège Saint-Pierre in Uccle. At 18, he enrolled at Saint-Louis University in Brussels, where he obtained a degree in Philosophy and Arts two years later. In 1949, after having completed his military service, he decided to take holy orders. He studied for a bachelor's degree in Classical Philology at the Catholic University of Louvain which, from 1951 onwards, became intermingled with his studies in theology at the Seminary of Malines. Ordained priest in 1955, he continued his studies in theology at Louvain and finally earned a doctorate and was conferred the title of "maître-agrégé" in Theology (1962). He then took up a career in teaching, first at the Seminary of Malines (1962–1969), and then at the Catholic University of Louvain where he was elected a full professor in 1969. He was the founding member of the managing committee of the Revue théologique de Louvain (1970).

The figure of this emeritus professor remains as one of the most influential ones of the Theology faculty of Louvain-la-Neuve, marked by his supervision of generations of students from Europe, America, and Africa. Aware of the position of Christianity in the modern world and the negative connotation of professing faith in God, he dedicated his entire career in formulating and in helping to understand the rapport between faith and contemporary culture in the best possible terms. His most significant writings encompassing a wide array of subjects were put together for the most part in the collection Dieu pour penser. The biannual symposium ("Colloque Gesché") which he instituted, from 1991 onwards in Louvain-la-Neuve in collaboration with Paul Scolas, aims to create a space for dialogue between Theology and other domains.

Recipient of many awards and prizes, he served on the commission "Religion and Theology" for the National Fund for Scientific Research (Belgium) and in the European Association for Catholic Theology (Tübingen). In 1992, he was appointed by the Holy See to the International Theological Commission (1992–2002). In 1993, he was awarded the Prix du Cardinal Mercier by the Institut Supérieur de Philosophie. In 1997, he received the Scriptores christiani award for the ensemble of his works, and in the following year, the Grand prix de philosophie from the Académie française in Paris. He was elected a member of the Royal Academy of Belgium and received the honorary title of the Grand Officer of the Order of the Crown.

On the occasion of his 75th birthday, he said: "God has been my passion. I could not put it otherwise." His deep pastoral concern led him to engage with the concerns and preoccupations of the men and women of society, both believers and non-believers.

He is buried in the Cemetery of Blocry in Ottignies, next to Louvain-la-Neuve.

== Works by Adolphe Gesché ==
Complete Bibliography

- Dieu pour penser. t.1 Le mal, Paris, Cerf, 1993.
- Dieu pour penser. t.2 L’homme, Paris, Cerf, 1993.
- Dieu pour penser. t.3 Dieu, Paris, Cerf, 1994.
- Dieu pour penser. t.4 Le cosmos, Paris, Cerf, 1994.
- Dieu pour penser. t.5 La destinée, Paris, Cerf, 1995.
- Dieu pour penser. t.6 Le Christ, Paris, Cerf, 2001.
- Dieu pour penser. t.7 Le sens, Paris, Cerf, 2003.
- Pensées pour penser. t.1 Le mal et la lumière, Paris, Cerf, 2003.
- Pensées pour penser. t.2 Les mots et les livres, Paris, Cerf, 2004.

Colloquia Gesché

- Destin, prédestination, destinée, Paris, Cerf, 1995.
- La foi dans le temps du risque, Paris, Cerf, 1997.
- La Sagesse, une chance pour l’espérance?, Paris, Cerf, 1998.
- Dieu à l’épreuve de notre cri, Paris, Cerf, 1999.
- Et si Dieu n’existait pas?, Paris, Cerf, 2001.
- Sauver le bonheur, Paris, Cerf, 2003.
- Le corps chemin de Dieu, Paris, Cerf, 2005.
- L’invention chrétienne du péché, Paris, Cerf, 2007.
- Qu’est-ce que la vérité ?, Paris, Cerf, 2009.
- La transgression chrétienne des identités, Paris, Cerf, 2012.
- Dieu au risque des religions, Louvain-ma-Neuve, Academia, 2014.
- Intempestive éternité, Paris, Louvain-la-Neuve, Academia, 2015.
- Migrant ou la vérité devant soi. Un enjeu d'humanité, Louvain-la-Neuve, 2017.

Publications about Adolphe Gesché

- Paulo RODRIGUES, Pensar al hombre. Antropología teológica de Adolphe Gesché (Bibliotheca Salmanticensis. Estudios, 333), Salamanca, Publicaciones Universidad Pontificia, 2012, 208 p. (ISBN 978-84-7299-937-4)
- Benoît BOURGINE, Paulo RODRIGUES, Paul SCOLAS (éds), La margelle du puits. Adolphe Gesché, une introduction, Paris, Cerf, 2013. (ISBN 978-2-204-10114-1)
- Jean-François GOSSELIN, Le rêve d’un théologien : pour une apologétique du désir. Crédibilité et idée de Dieu dans l’œuvre d’Adolphe Gesché (Théologies), Paris, Cerf, 2014, ISBN 978-2-204-10965-9
- Maria de Socorro SICILIANI BARRAZA, Antropología del sentido y teología del don: aporte de Adolphe Gesché (Humanismo y persona, 4), Bogotá, Editorial Buenaventuriana, 2016, ISBN 978-9-588-92822-7

=== External links ===
- Research Network Adolphe Gesché (RRAG)
- Adolphe Gesché Bibliography
- Adolphe Gesché Digital File
