= Leuven Database of Ancient Books =

The Leuven Database of Ancient Books (LDAB) is a resource for all ancient written literary manuscripts, from 500 BC to AD 800. It currently lists more than 16.000 Greek, Latin, Coptic, Syriac and Demotic literary texts. It is said that it "attempts to collect the basic information on all ancient literary texts". It includes authors from Homer to Gregory the Great and more than 3.600 texts of unidentified authors.

It was founded in 1998 at the KU Leuven by Willy Clarysse.
