= Rongorongo text G =

One of the undeciphered texts of Easter Island

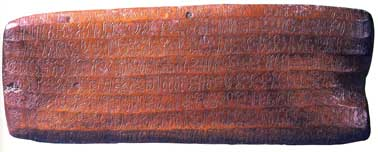

Text G of the rongorongo corpus, the smaller of two tablets located in Santiago and therefore also known as the Small Santiago tablet, is one of two dozen surviving rongorongo texts. It may include a short genealogy.

== Other names ==
G is the standard designation, from Barthel (1958). Fischer (1997) refers to it as RR8.

== Location ==
Museo Nacional de Historia Natural, Santiago. Catalog # 5.497 (314).

There are reproductions at the Musée de l'Homme, Paris; Padri dei Sacri Cuori (SSCC), Rome; Museum of Mankind, London; Ibero-American Institute, Berlin; Bishop Museum, Honolulu; Department of Anthropology, National Museum of Natural History, Smithsonian Institution, Washington; American Museum of Natural History, New York; van Hoorebeeck Collection, Belgium; and in Steven Fischer's collection in Auckland.

== Description ==

A fluted tablet in excellent condition, 32 × 12.1 × 1.8 cm, of Pacific rosewood (Orliac 2005).

== Provenance ==
In 1870 Father Roussel gave tablets G and H to Captain Gana of the Chilean corvette O'Higgins. They remained in the custody of the Chilean navy in Valparaíso until they were sent to the newly established department of archeology at the Museo Nacional de Historia Natural.

== Contents ==
In 1956 Butinov and Knorozov noted that the structure of a sequence of 15 glyphs in Gv6 suggested that it was a genealogy: A son of B, B son of C, C son of D, ... The final glyph 76 in each sequence, which Fischer (1997) sees as a phallus, would thus be a patronymic taxogram and would mark personal names on other tablets, something which Guy (1998) considers to be a reasonable interpretation.

Several scholars have noticed that tablet G contains two structurally very different texts. Most of Gr is paraphrased as text K, while the last line and a half of Gr and the whole of Gv share short phrases with I and T (or at least Ta) but not the rest of the rongorongo corpus (Pozdniakov 1996:290, 299).

== Text ==
Eight lines of glyphs on each side, for ~ 720 glyphs in all.

Harrison (1874:379) noticed that lines Gr3-7 feature a compound glyph, 380.1+3 (a figure on a vertical rod with a garland), repeated 31 times, each followed by up to half a dozen glyphs before the next. He thought that the figure broke the text into sections, each of which contained the name of a chief. Fischer agrees that these sections appear to be names, and Guy (2001) identifies the garland as a determinative of royalty.

Most of the recto (lines 1-7) is repeated with little change on the younger London tablet; after this the structure of the text changes radically, making the last line and a half of Gr and the whole side of Gv distinct from the rest of the rongorongo corpus. In addition, Pozdniakov found a brief sequence of glyphs that crosses from Gr8 to Gv1, confirming Barthel's reading order.

Recto

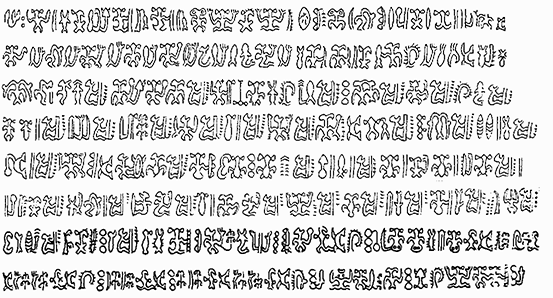
Recto, as traced by Barthel. The lines have been rearranged to reflect English reading order: Gr1 at top, Gr8 at bottom.

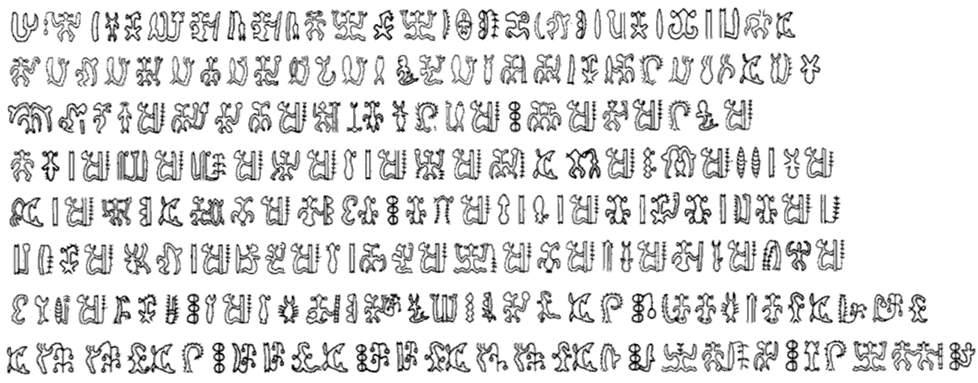
Recto, as traced by Fischer.

Verso

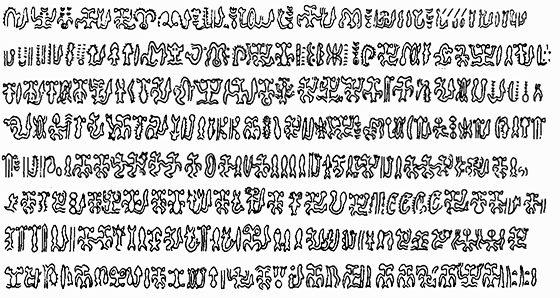
Verso, as traced by Barthel: Gv1 at top, Gv8 at bottom.

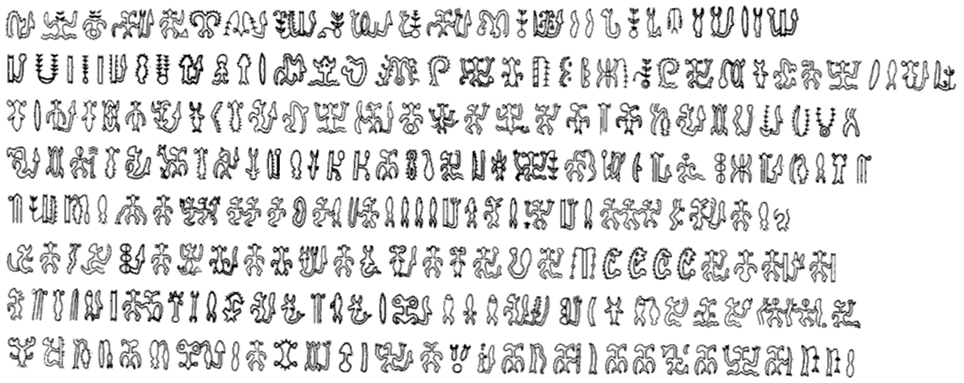
Verso, as traced by Fischer.

== Image gallery ==
Recto

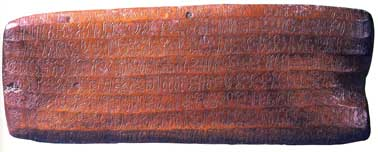
Recto, color (upside down)

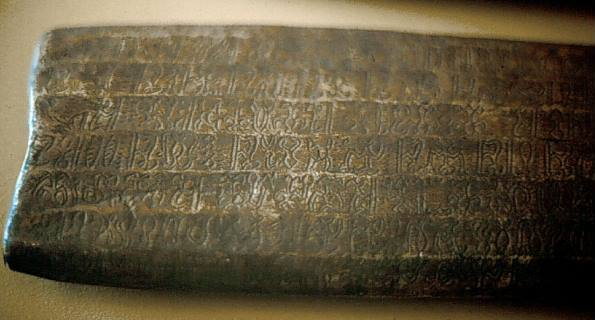
Recto, partial, color

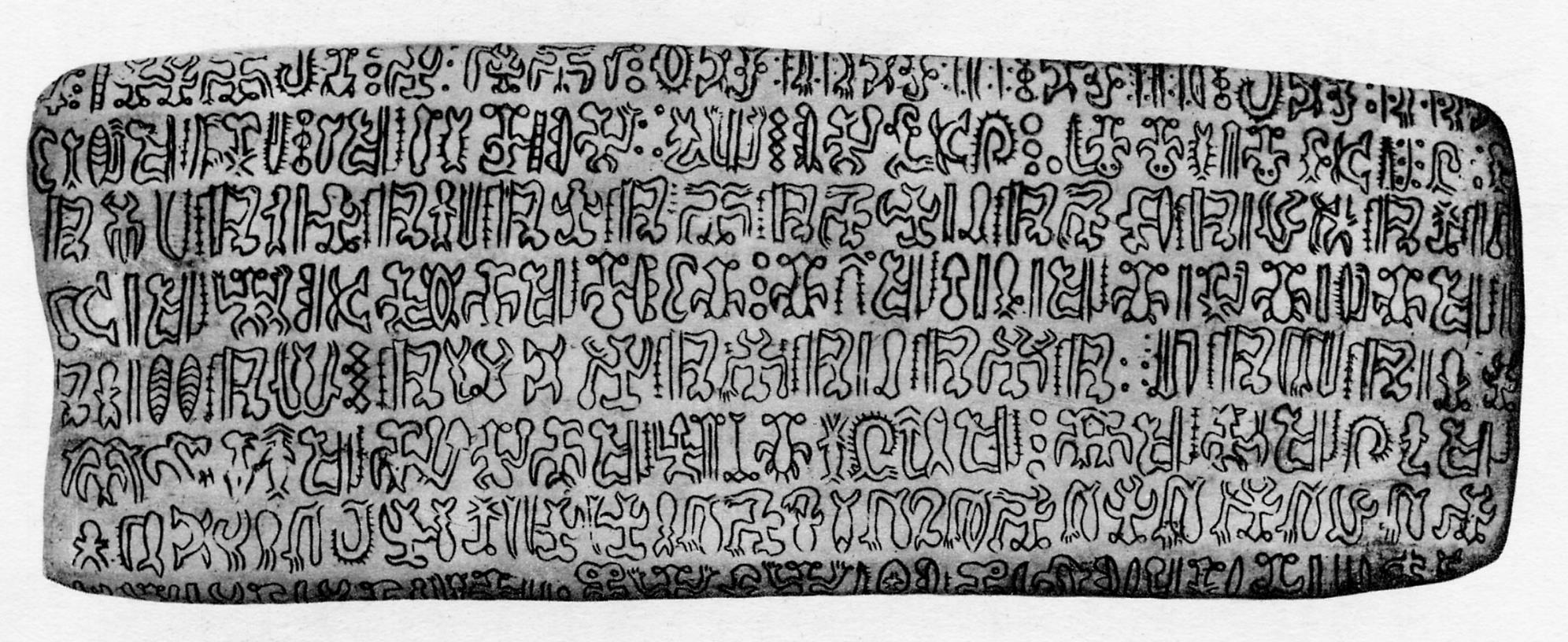
Recto, glyphs traced

Recto, illustrated
Verso

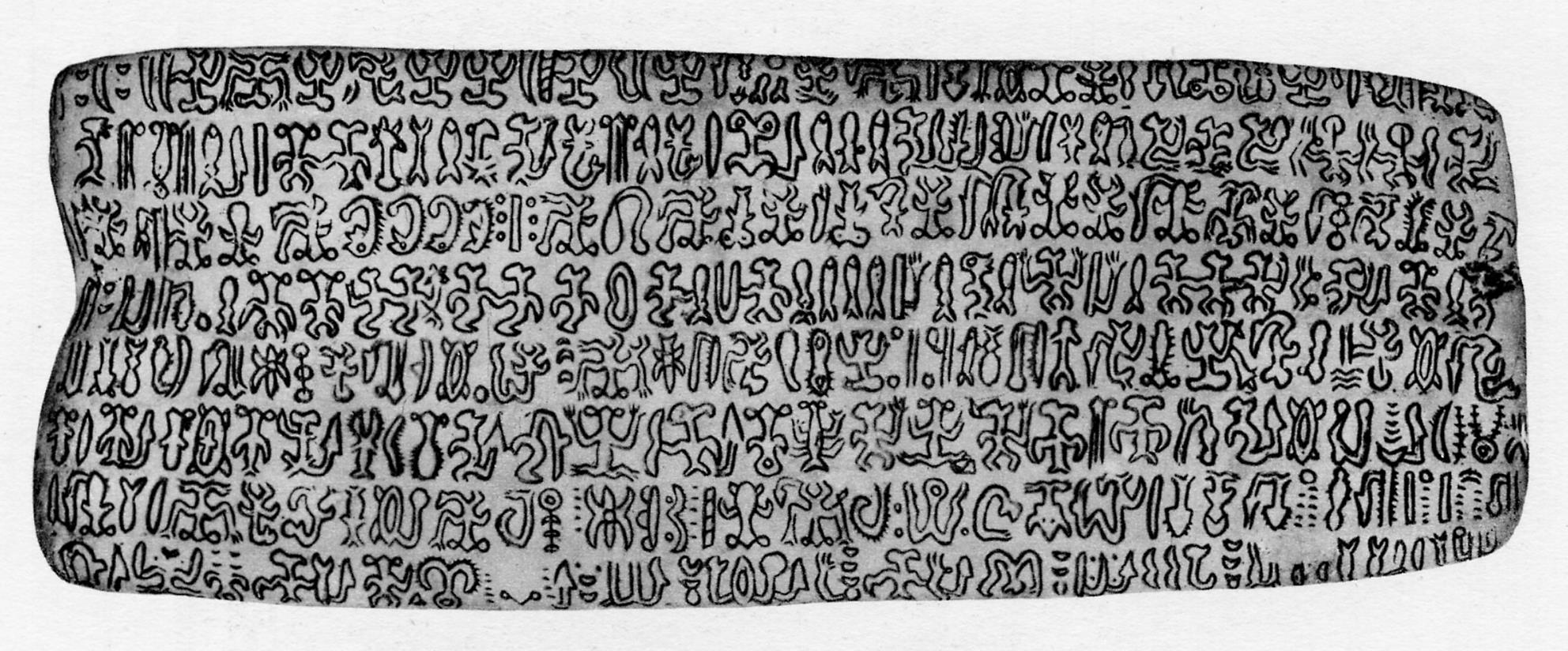
Verso, glyphs traced

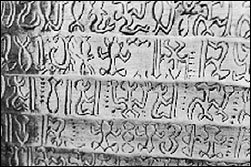
Closeup of recto lines 2 (bottom, partial) to 6 (top)

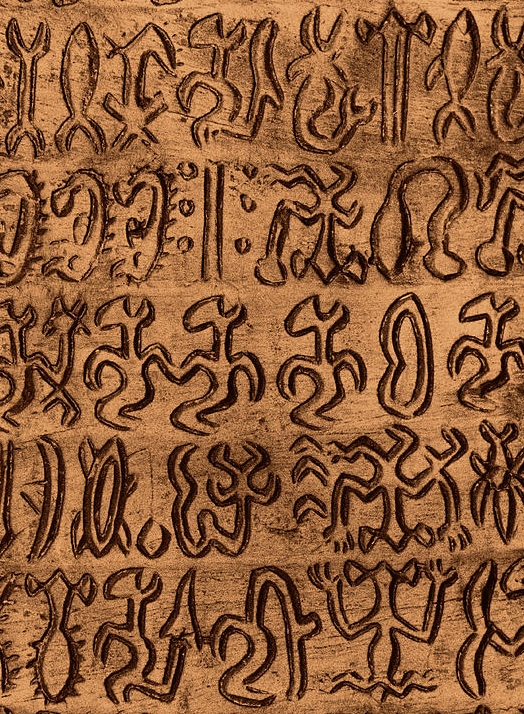
Closeup of verso lines 3 (bottom) to 7 (top)

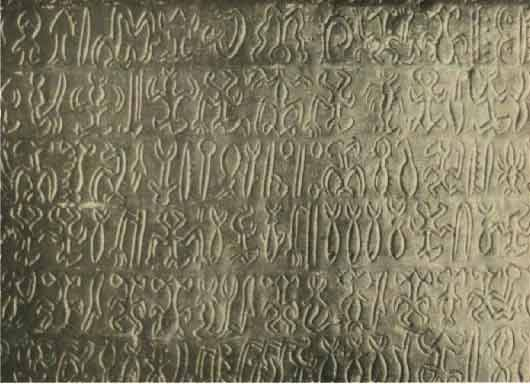
Part of verso lines 2 (top) to 7 (bottom)

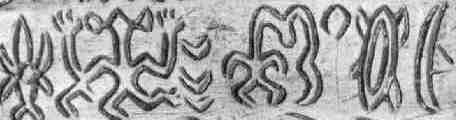
Part of verso line 4

The putative genealogy

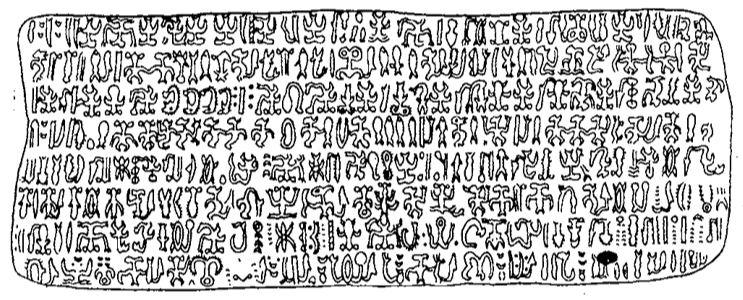
Verso, illustrated
