= Moisés Tuʻu Hereveri =

Titular King of Rapa Nui
- Reign: 1901–1902
- Predecessor: Enrique Ika
- Successor: Valentino Riroroko Tuki
- Born: c. 1873; Haapape, Mahina, Kingdom of Tahiti
- Died: 3 September 1925; Easter Island, Chile
- Spouse: Parapina Uka o Tu’a a Vaka
- Issue: Mateo Hereveri Vaka others
Names
- Moisés Jacob Tu‘u Hereveri
- Father: Akutino Hereveri
- Mother: Margarita Vaiatare
- Religion: Roman Catholicism

Moisés Jacob Tu‘u Hereveri (c. 1873 – 3 September 1925) was elected ‘ariki (king) of Rapa Nui (Easter Island) from 1901 until 1902. He was the last Rapa Nui to claim the traditional kingship in the early 20th-century. However, he is not remembered as the last king; instead his predecessor Riro Kāinga is generally regarded as the last king, although neither held much power. (Note: Kerekorio Manu Rangi, the last undisputed ‘ariki mau, died during an outbreak of tuberculosis in 1867. Although Riro Kāinga and his predecessor Atamu Tekena held the title of king, their power and legitimacy in comparison with their predecessors are doubted. Historian Alfred Métraux wrote, Although the islanders of to-day speak of the late kings, Atamu Te Kena and Riroroko, as if they were really kings, informants make it clear that they had very little in common with the ariki of olden days. Their power was of an indefinite, dubious nature, and they seem to have enjoyed none of the prerogatives of former ariki. Perhaps their only claim to the title lay in their descent-line; both belonged to the Miru group. Possibly if native civilization had continued, they might have been true kings. Personal pretension, supported by Chilean officers who needed a responsible intermediary to deal with the population, might have contributed toward the restoration of power to this fictitious and ephemeral royalty. — Métraux 1937, p. 42) Variation of his family name included Hereveri, Here Veri, Veri-Veri, Beri-Beri, Tueri-Beri, Tueriveri, or Tueriveri.

== Biography ==
Hereveri was born, of Rapa Nui descent, in 1873, (Note: Another source stated that Hereveri was born c. 1861.) at Haapape, in the French Protectorate of the Kingdom of Tahiti, now near present-day Point Venus, Mahina, French Polynesia. His father was Here Veri, baptized Agustín (Akutino), also known as Akutino Hereveri (1851–1894), and his mother was Vai a Tare, baptized Margarita, also known as Maria Te Vai a Tare (1840–?). He was baptized Moite or Moisés. His family was part of the Miru clan, specifically the Miru Hamea branch.

Hereveri's family was part of the diaspora community of Rapa Nui which settled in Tahiti. On 6 June 1871, half of the Rapa Nui population, around 277 islanders, followed the Father Hippolyte Roussel and Brother Théodule Escolan, French Catholic missionaries of the Congregation of the Sacred Hearts of Jesus and Mary to Tahiti and Mangareva after disputes between the missionaries and rancher Jean-Baptiste Dutrou-Bornier. His parents would have been one of the 108 Rapa Nui who followed Brother Escolan and were employed in British businessman John Brander's plantation on Tahiti, or the 67 islanders sent by Dutrou-Bornier to join the workers in October 1871.

Back on Easter Island, the penultimate King Atamu Tekena ceded the island to Chile (represented by Captain Policarpo Toro) on 9 September 1888. However, the treaty of annexation was never ratified by Chile and Toro's colony failed. The Chilean government abandoned the settlement in 1892 due to political troubles on the mainland, which was embroiled in civil war, and this prompted the Rapa Nui to reassert their independence. The Miru clan representative, Siméon Riro Kāinga, was elected the position of ‘Ariki or King of Rapa Nui left vacant by the death of Atamu Tekena in August 1892.

The Rapa Nui unsuccessfully attempted to reclaim indigenous sovereignty in the absence of direct Chilean control from 1892 to 1896. However, Chile reasserted its claim, and the island was later leased to Enrique Merlet and his ranching company. Alberto Sánchez Manterola was appointed Merlet's representative and also appointed Chile's maritime sub-delegate. They restricted the islanders' access to most of their land except a walled-off settlement at Hanga Roa, which they were not allowed to leave without permission. The young king attempted to protest the company's abuse but died under suspicious circumstances at Valparaíso. News of the king's death did not reach the island until March 1899. Subsequently, Sánchez declared the native kingship abolished. According to the accounts of Bienvenido de Estella, Sánchez declared to the islanders, “Ya no hay más rey en la isla. ¡Yo mando!”. He later wrote in 1921, “...desde que se supo la muerte del Rey puse mano firme para terminar con esta dinastía y creo haberlo conseguido porque no se habló más del sucesor de Riro Roco.”

Riro Kāinga has been generally referred to as the last king of Easter Island. However, two other candidates for the kingship existed after him. Enrique Ika was proclaimed king on 8 January 1900. Moisés Tuʻu Hereveri was elected king in 1901. Hereveri was elected with the permission of Sánchez's successor Horacio Cooper White, who was considered much more a despotic administrator than his predecessor. Cooper wanted to discredit a rebellion led by Chilean shepherd Manuel A. Vega who had married Véronique Mahute, Riro's widow. Moisés Tuʻu Hereveri was "crowned" in a ceremony presided by Catholic catechist Nicolás Pakarati Urepotahi with Cooper in attendance. The new king led an unsuccessful rebellion influenced by the Catholic catechist Angata, another member of the Miru clan. The conflict was spurred when the Chilean guards began kidnapping married Rapa Nui women and keeping them at the company's headquarters in Mataveri while their husbands worked in the field. Hereveri commanded the Rapa Nui men in rescuing their wives and skirmishes with the company followed. The Rapa Nui pushed the forces of Cooper to Mataveri. The rebellion was quelled on 19 July 1902 with the arrival of the Chilean Naval corvette Baquedano.

Hereveri married Uka o Tu’a a Vaka (born in 1872), baptized Balbina (Parapina), also known as Parapina Avaka, who was the daughter of Tomenika a Vakatukuonge, another indigenous Catholic catechist who lived at the islands leprosery and was allegedly one of the last Rapa Nui to understand the rongorongo script. His descendants bear the surname Hereveri. According to the published sources of Bienvenido de Estella and J. I. Vives Solar, Hereveri was exiled by the Chilean authority from the island after his unsuccessful revolt in 1902 for a decade. It was alleged that he served a career as a midshipman in the Chilean Navy and journeyed around the world in 1908. Rapa Nui historian Cristián Moreno Pakarati places doubt on the account of Hereveri's deportation because there is no document to indicate it. He also called the account of his naval career erroneous and possibly convoluted by the experience of his son Mateo Hereveri Vaka as a cabin boy on a Chilean naval ship. Hereveri died at Easter Island, on 3 September 1925. Pakarati noted that Enrique Ika and Moisés Tu‘u Hereveri have been unjustly forgotten by Rapa Nui historiography.

In 1902, Chile appointed Rapa Nui cultural informant Juan Tepano as cacique in an attempt to end indigenous resistance. A decade later, Angata led another unsuccessful rebellion against the ranching company in 1914. It was crushed when the Chilean navy arrested the ringleaders of the revolt. The kingship remained vacant for a century after Ika and Hereveri. An independence movement has continued on the island. In 2011, Riro Kāinga's grandson, Valentino Riroroko Tuki, declared himself king of Rapa Nui.

== See also ==
- History of Easter Island

== Bibliography ==
- Cristino, Claudio; Fuentes, Miguel (May 2011). La Compañia Explotadora de Isla de Pascua Patrimonio, Memoria e identidad en Rapa Nui (PDF). Rapa Nui: Ediciones Escaparate. ISBN 9789567827992. OCLC 1080351219.
- Delsing, Riet (May 2004). "Colonialism and Resistance in Rapa Nui" (PDF). Rapa Nui Journal. 18 (1). Los Ocos, CA: The Easter Island Foundation: 24–30. OCLC 930607850.
- Fischer, Steven R. (2005). Island at the End of the World: The Turbulent History of Easter Island. London: Reaktion Books. ISBN 978-1-86189-245-4. OCLC 254147531.
- Fischer, Steven R. (1997). Rongorongo: The Easter Island Script : History, Traditions, Texts. Oxford: Clarendon Press. ISBN 978-0-19-823710-5. OCLC 247739920.
- Gonschor, Lorenz Rudolf (August 2008). Law as a Tool of Oppression and Liberation: Institutional Histories and Perspectives on Political Independence in Hawaiʻi, Tahiti Nui/French Polynesia and Rapa Nui (PDF) (MA thesis). Honolulu: University of Hawaii at Manoa. hdl:10125/20375. OCLC 798846333.
- Hotus, Alberto (1988). Te Mau hatu ʻo Rapa Nui. Santiago: Editorial Emisión. OCLC 123102513.
- Métraux, Alfred (June 1937). "The Kings of Easter Island". The Journal of the Polynesian Society. 46 (2). Wellington: The Polynesian Society: 41–62. JSTOR 20702667. OCLC 6015249623.
- Muñoz, Diego (2014). "Las Tierras Rapanui de Pamatai (Tahiti)" (PDF). Revista Apuntes del Museo Padre Sebastian Englert: 31–72.
- Muñoz, Diego (2015). "The Rapanui diaspora in Tahiti and the lands of Pamatai (1871–1970)". Rapa Nui Journal. 29 (2). Los Osos, CA: Easter Island Foundation: 5–22. doi:10.1353/rnj.2015.0011. hdl:10524/75841. S2CID 131541256.
- Pakarati, Cristián Moreno (2015) [2010]. Los últimos 'Ariki Mau y la evolución del poder político en Rapa Nui.
- Pakarati, Cristián Moreno (2015). Rebelión, Sumisión y Mediación en Rapa Nui (1896–1915).
- Tryon, Darrell T. (1970). Conversational Tahitian: An Introduction to the Tahitian Language of French Polynesia. Berkeley: University of California Press. ISBN 978-0-520-01600-2. OCLC 1087412005.
- Routledge, Katherine (1919). The Mystery of Easter Island: The Story of an Expedition. London: Printed for the author by Hazell, Watson and Viney. OCLC 955343438.
- Van Tilburg, JoAnne (2003). Among Stone Giants: The Life of Katherine Routledge and Her Remarkable Expedition to Easter Island. New York: Scribner. ISBN 978-0-7432-4480-0. OCLC 253375820.

Titles in pretence
Vacant Title last held by Enrique Ika	King of Rapa Nui; 1901–1902	Vacant Title next held by Valentino Riroroko Tuki
