= Angata =

Rapa Nui religious and rebel leader

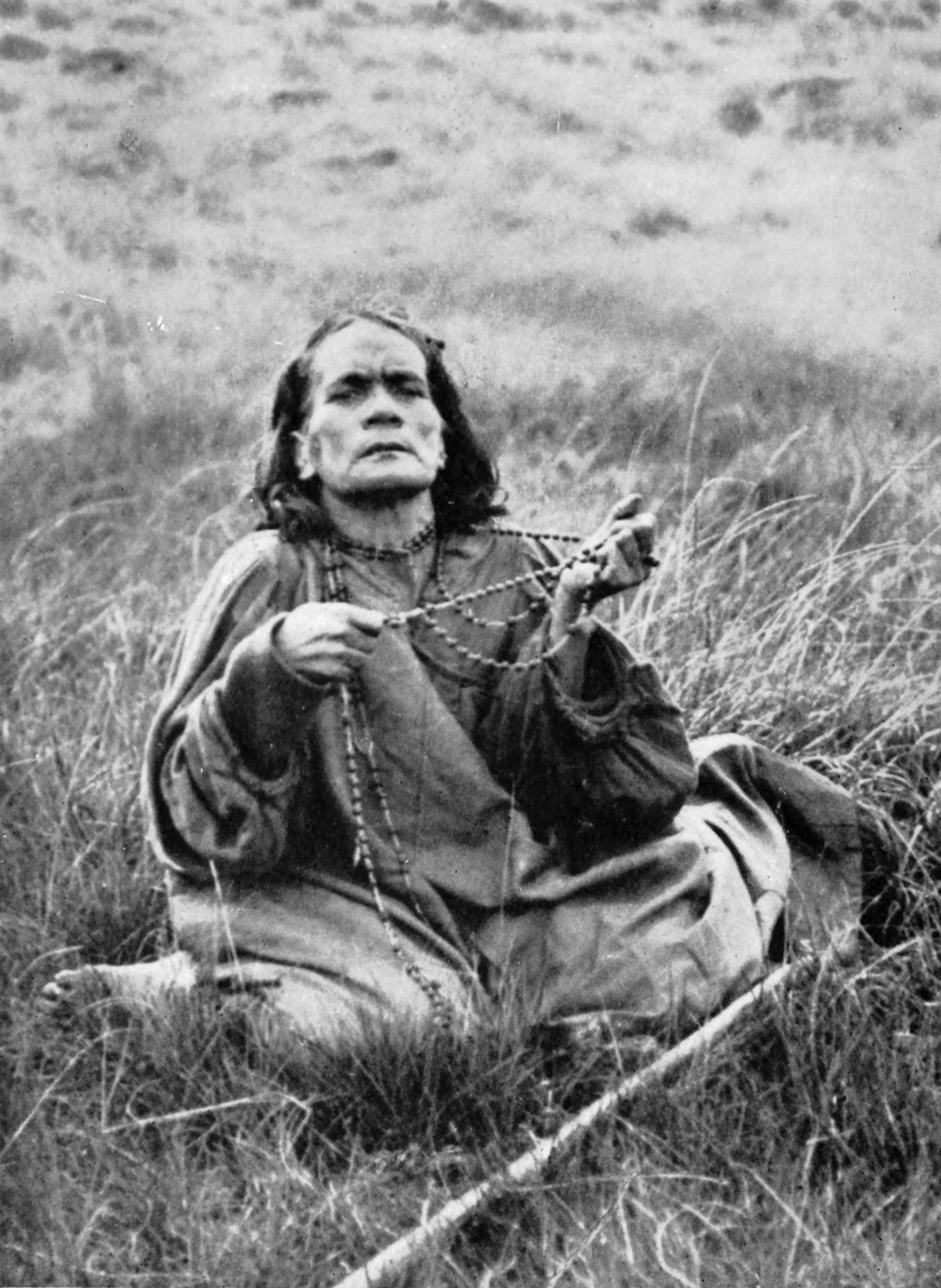
- Angata during the Mana Expedition, 1914
- Born: c. 1853; Easter Island
- Died: December 1914; Hanga Roa, Easter Island
- Known for: Angata's rebellion
- Spouses: Daniel Manu Heu Roroa; Pakomīo Māʻori Ure Kino

Angata, full name María Angata Veri Tahi ʻa Pengo Hare Koho (c. 1853 – December 1914) was a Catholic Rapa Nui religious leader from Easter Island during the late 19th and early 20th century. After experiencing a prophetic vision in which God instructed her to retake the land and livestock, she led an unsuccessful rebellion on the island against the Williamson-Balfour Company, intending to create a theocracy centered on Catholicism and Rapa Nui spiritual values.

== Conversion ==
Angata was born around 1853 into the Miru clan. Between 1864 and 1866, the French Picpus missionaries established themselves on Easter Island and converted many of the Rapa Nui people to Christianity during a period of severe population collapse caused by Peruvian slave raiding and the introduction of European diseases.

In 1871, Angata and her first husband, Daniel Manu Heu Roroa, travelled to Mangareva in the Gambier Islands with Father Hippolyte Roussel. She had two children from this marriage. Her husband reportedly beat her so severely that it caused her to become permanently hunchbacked. Her cousins killed him in retaliation for the abuse.

On Mangareva, she began learning the Christian scriptures by heart. Father Roussel trained her to become a catechist or lay teacher for the new Congregation of the Sacred Hearts of Jesus and Mary.

== Return to Easter Island ==
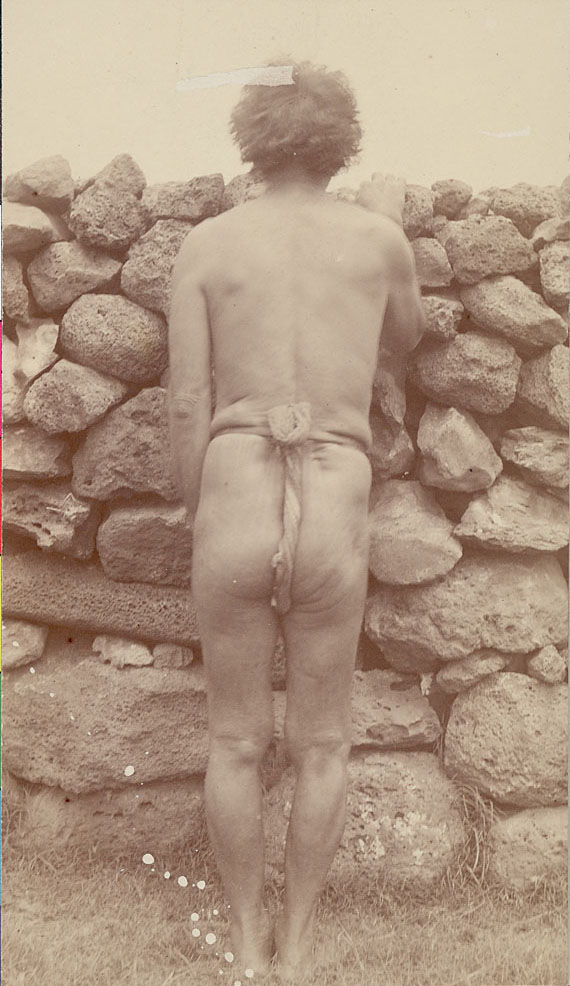
Pakomīo in traditional loincloth, December 1886

When Angata returned to Easter Island in October 1879, she worked as co-catechist and assistant to Nicolás Pakarati and Pakomīo Māʻori Ure Kino (c. 1816/1836–1908/1909), whom she had married on Mangareva. They became the island's principal spiritual leaders in the absence of a resident missionary. Angata and her second husband had six children together. The children supposedly inherited European Basque features from their father, despite Angata and Pakomio claiming full-blood Rapa Nui descent.

In 1892, Angata organized many of the women on the island to support her cousin Siméon Riro Kāinga (both were members of the Miru clan) for the position of ‘Ariki or King of Rapa Nui against the rival claimant Enrique Ika, also a Miru. The position was left vacant by the death of Atamu Tekena, who had ceded the island to Chile in 1888. It has been argued that he was elected mainly because of his good looks, but a significant part of his success was also due Angata's strong influence with the people.

Riro unsuccessfully attempted to reclaim indigenous sovereignty in the absence of direct Chilean control from 1892 to 1896. However, Chile reasserted its claim, and the island was later leased to Enrique Merlet and his ranching company. They restricted the islanders' access to most of their land except a walled-off settlement at Hanga Roa, which they were not allowed to leave without permission. The young king attempted to protest the company's abuse but died under suspicious circumstances at Valparaíso.

== 1914 rebellion ==
Merlet's manager outlawed the native kingship on the island, although Enrique Ika and Moisés Tuʻu Hereveri were briefly elected kings. Angata would assume nominal leadership of the Miru clan and lead the opposition to the company's control. The Williamson-Balfour Company later took control of the ranch from Merlet and continued the mistreatment of the Rapa Nui people. In 1914, Angata had a prophetic vision that Merlet was dead. This inspired her to lead an unsuccessful rebellion against the company, stating that God wanted the islanders to retake the island, kill the ranch's livestock, and have a feast. On 30 June 1914, she sent her son-in-law Daniera Maria Teave Haukena to the company manager Henry Percy Edmunds with a declaration that the natives intended to retake the land and livestock from the company.

The rebellion was crushed on 5 August when the Chilean naval vessel Baquedano arrived and arrested four of the ringleaders. Comandante Almanzor Hernández declared that the Rapa Nui had been "fully justified in doing everything they had done". He later commented he was glad they had not murdered Edmunds. None of the natives were punished, and three of the imprisoned leaders were released but her son-in-law Daniera was deported from the island.

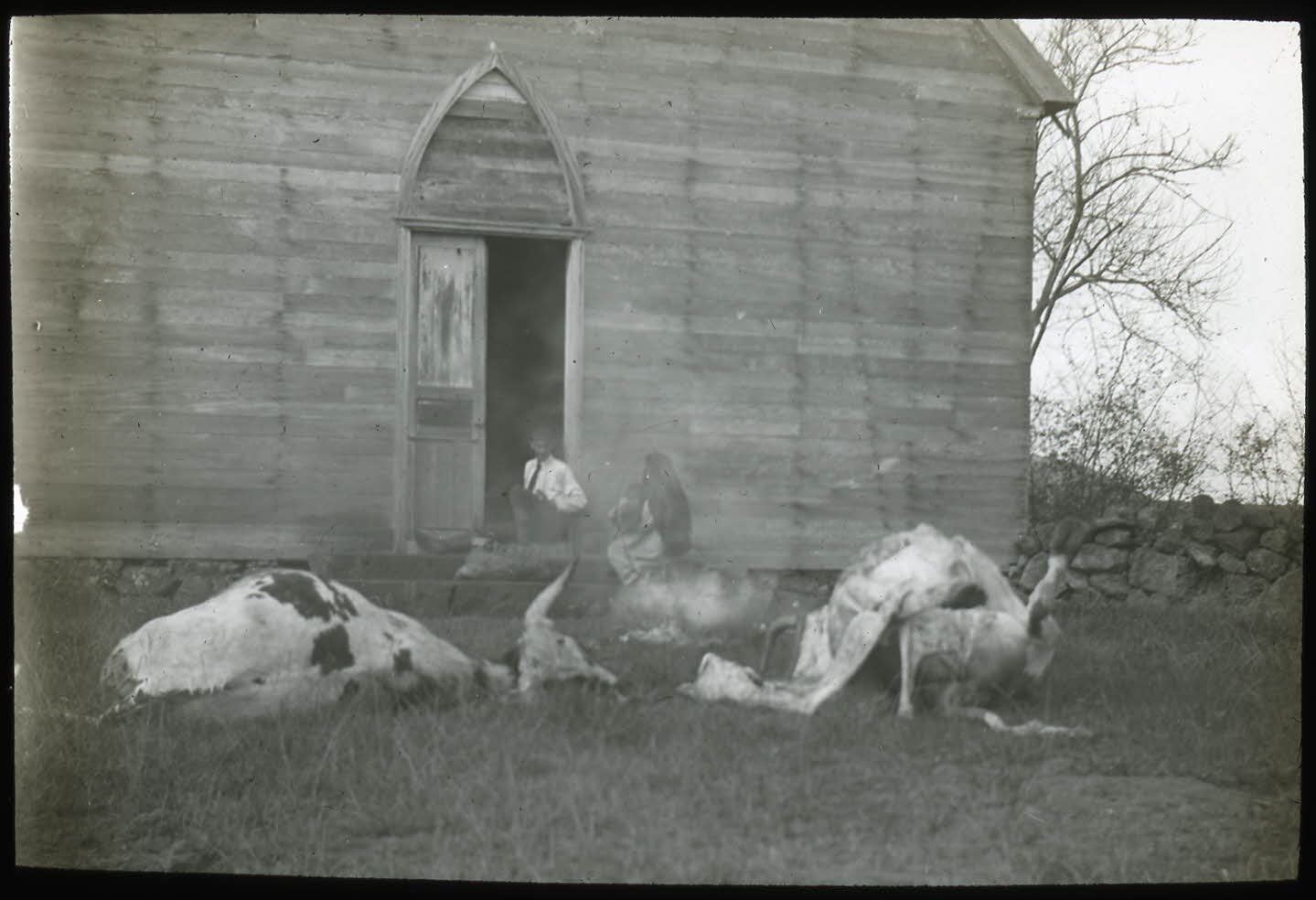
Carcasses of dead cattle in front of a house at Hanga Roa, 1914

The rebellion, which was intended to establish a kingdom of God based on Rapa Nui understandings, had the negative effect of provoking the Chilean government into imposing a stronger administration. A separate colonial official (not affiliated to the company) was appointed. The island was opened to immigration from the mainland, decreasing the influence of the native islanders.

Despite these changes, the independence movement has continued on the island to the present day. The walls confining the Rapa Nui to Hanga Roa were torn down in 1966.

During the Mana Expedition to Easter Island in 1914, the English anthropologist Katherine Routledge met and spoke with Angata at the height of her rebellion. Routledge tried to dissuade the "prophetess" as she referred to her, and her people, from continuing their raids and killing the island's livestock. She describes Angata during their interview:

[S]he was a frail old woman with grey hair and expressive eyes, a distinctly attractive and magnetic personality. She wore suspended round her neck some sort of religious medallion, a red cross, I think, on a white ground, and her daughter who supported her carried a small picture of the Saviour in an Oxford frame. She held my hand most amiably during the interview, addressing me as "Caterina." ... As I spoke of the raids her face hardened and her eyes took the look of a fanatic; she said something about "God" with the upward gesture which was her habit in speaking His name. I hastened to relieve the tension by saying that "We must all worship God," and was happy to find that I was allowed a share in the Deity. Her manner again softened, and looking up to heaven she declared, with an assured confidence, which was in its way sublime, "God will never let the Kanakas be either killed or hurt."

— Routledge 1919, p. 145

Angata died in December 1914, months after her meeting with Routledge. Her funeral on 29 January 1915 was attended by the English anthropologist. She was buried at the cemetery of Holy Cross Church, Hanga Roa, next to other early Catholic missionaries: Eugène Eyraud, Nicolás Pakarati, and Sebastian Englert.

== See also ==
- History of Easter Island

== Bibliography ==
- Delsing, Riet (May 2004). "Colonialism and Resistance in Rapa Nui" (PDF). Rapa Nui Journal. 18 (1). Los Ocos, CA: The Easter Island Foundation: 24–30. OCLC 930607850. Archived from the original (PDF) on 2014-09-23.
- Fischer, Steven R. (2005). Island at the End of the World: The Turbulent History of Easter Island. London: Reaktion Books. ISBN 978-1-86189-245-4. OCLC 254147531.
- Fischer, Steven R. (1997). Rongorongo: The Easter Island Script : History, Traditions, Texts. Oxford: Clarendon Press. ISBN 978-0-19-823710-5. OCLC 247739920.
- Gonschor, Lorenz Rudolf (August 2008). Law as a Tool of Oppression and Liberation: Institutional Histories and Perspectives on Political Independence in Hawaiʻi, Tahiti Nui/French Polynesia and Rapa Nui (PDF) (MA thesis). Honolulu: University of Hawaii at Manoa. hdl:10125/20375. OCLC 798846333. Archived from the original (PDF) on 2020-01-02.
- Langdon, Robert (December 1995). "Pakomio Maori: red-haired, blue-eyed key to Easter Island's prehistoric past" (PDF). Rapa Nui Journal. 9 (4). Los Ocos, CA: The Easter Island Foundation: 109–117. OCLC 193099949. Archived from the original (PDF) on 2020-11-12.
- McCall, Grant (1992). D. H. Rubinstein (ed.). "37 Days that shook the (Rapanui) world: The Angata cult on Rapanui". Proceedings of the Pacific History Association. Mangilao: University of Guam Press: 17–23. OCLC 27362070.
- McCall, Grant (September 1997). "Riro Rapu and Rapanui: Refoundations in Easter Island Colonial History" (PDF). Rapa Nui Journal. 11 (3). Los Ocos, CA: The Easter Island Foundation: 112–122. OCLC 197901224. Archived from the original (PDF) on 2014-09-23.
- Pakarati, Cristián Moreno (2015) [2010]. Los últimos 'Ariki Mau y la evolución del poder político en Rapa Nui.
- Pakarati, Cristián Moreno (2015). Rebelión, Sumisión y Mediación en Rapa Nui (1896–1915).
- Routledge, Katherine (1919). The Mystery of Easter Island: The Story of an Expedition. London: Printed for the author by Hazell, Watson and Viney. OCLC 955343438.
- Van Tilburg, JoAnne (1994). Easter Island: Archaeology, Ecology and Culture. Washington, DC: Smithsonion Institution Press. ISBN 978-1-56098-510-5. OCLC 32163979.
- Van Tilburg, JoAnne (2003). Among Stone Giants: The Life of Katherine Routledge and Her Remarkable Expedition to Easter Island. New York: Scribner. ISBN 978-0-7432-4480-0. OCLC 253375820.
