= Riro Kāinga =

Riro ʻa Kāinga
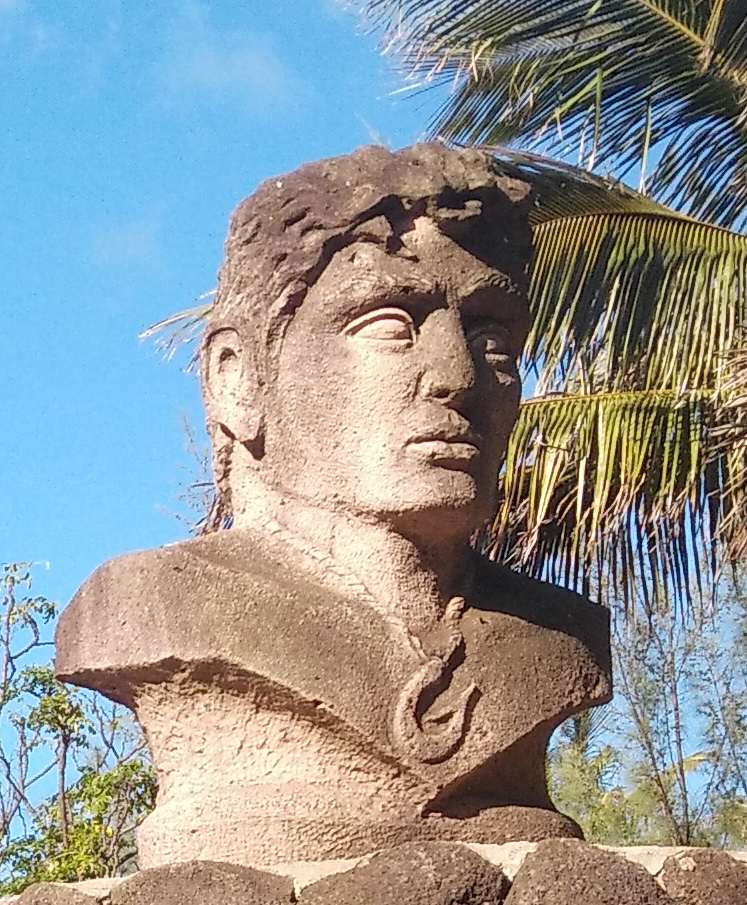
- Bust of Siméon Riro Kāinga at Hanga Roa

King of Rapa Nui
- Reign: 1892–1898/1899
- Predecessor: Atamu Tekena
- Successor: Enrique Ika
- Born: Mataveri
- Died: 1898/1899; Valparaíso
- Spouse: Véronique Mahute
- Issue: Simeón Riroroko Mahute; Jorge Riroroko Mahute; Virginia Riroroko Mahute; Juan Riroroko Mahute
Names
- Timeone Riro ʻa Kāinga Rokoroko He Tau
- Father: Ngure a Pariko
- Mother: Nene Pōike
- Religion: Catholicism

Siméon or Timeone Riro ʻa Kāinga Rokoroko He Tau (died 1898 or 1899) was the last ‘ariki (king) of Rapa Nui (Easter Island) from 1892 until his death. (Note: Although Riro Kāinga and his predecessor Atamu Tekena held the title of king, their power and legitimacy in comparison with their predecessors are doubted. Historian Alfred Métraux wrote, Although the islanders of to-day speak of the late kings, Atamu Te Kena and Riroroko, as if they were really kings, informants make it clear that they had very little in common with the ariki of olden days. Their power was of an indefinite, dubious nature, and they seem to have enjoyed none of the prerogatives of former ariki. Perhaps their only claim to the title lay in their descent-line; both belonged to the Miru group. Possibly if native civilization had continued, they might have been true kings. Personal pretension, supported by Chilean officers who needed a responsible intermediary to deal with the population, might have contributed toward the restoration of power to this fictitious and ephemeral royalty. — Métraux 1937, p. 42) He ruled the island during a brief period of indigenous autonomy between Chile's initial annexation in 1888 and the country's reassertion of colonial authority in 1896. Riro died unexpectedly during a diplomatic trip to Chile to discuss the island's sovereignty with colonial authorities, leading to suspicions that he had been poisoned.

== Early life ==
Riro was born at Mataveri, the son of Ngaure (or Ngure, the son of Pariko). His father was a follower of Torometi, a native strongman and supporter of French adventurer Jean-Baptiste Dutrou-Bornier. His mother was named Nene Pōike. Riro was baptized Siméon (or Timeone) into the Catholic Church by the French Picpus missionaries on 9 March 1879. He was a member of the Miru clan which the ‘ariki mau or traditional rulers of Easter Island belonged to. Although, his family was from the Miru o Kao branch of the clan with no direct patrilineal relationship with the ancient ariki, but were their tumu (their wives married the men of the royal lineage).

After the 1892 death of Atamu Tekena, who had been appointed king by the Picpus mission, Riro and Enrique Ika a Tuʻu Hati were candidates for the throne. Although both were of royal descent, Ika was more closely related to Kerekorio Manu Rangi, the last undisputed ‘ariki mau, who died during an outbreak of tuberculosis in 1867. Riro's cousin Maria Angata Veri Tahi 'a Pengo Hare Kohou, a Catholic catechist and prophet, organized many of the island's women in his support. He was probably seventeen to twenty-one years old at the time, and was elected primarily because of his good looks and Angata's influence.

== Reign ==
Riro adopted the epithet "Rokoroko He Tau", which had been used by Kerekorio, after his election. Angata arranged his 1889 marriage to Véronique Hitiairangi Renga Mahute (1874–1947), a Tahitian-born Rapa Nui woman adopted by a Rapa Nui couple who returned to the island in 1888. She was the daughter Mahoni a Mahute and Marta “Marate” Paruvaka and from the lineage of Tupahotu Ngaruti and Koro Orongo. They had three sons and one daughter: Simeón Riroroko Mahute, Jorge, Virginia and Juan. His descendants used the surname Rikoriko to signify their clan.

His predecessor, Atamu Tekena, ceded Easter Island to Chile (represented by Captain Policarpo Toro) on 9 September 1888. However, the treaty of annexation was never ratified by Chile and Toro's colony failed. The Chilean government abandoned the settlement in 1892 due to political troubles on the mainland, which was embroiled in civil war, and this prompted the Rapa Nui to reassert their independence. Like his predecessor, Riro ruled under a council of native leaders and the influence of the Catholic Church (represented by Angata and other native catechists). He also appointed his opponent Ika as his prime minister.

During this period "the Rapanui under Riro Kāinga restored their government in even clearer forms than before the annexation, to the point where it might indeed have qualified as a State, so that its arbitrary second takeover by Chile in 1896 could be considered legally questionable as well." Unlike Tekena, Riro reasserted native rule by standing up to foreign residents (such as Charles Higgins) and restored a degree of peace and stability to the island. European diseases and Peruvian slave raids had decimated the native population; by 1896 the island's population was 214, rebounding from a low of 110 in 1877.

Flag of the kingdom of Rapa Nui from 1876 to 1888

After four years of neglect when no foreign ships visited Easter Island, Chile reasserted its sovereignty in 1896 by leasing the island to the Sociedad Ovejera Merlet & Cia (Merlet & Company Sheep Society). The company was headed by Enrique Merlet, who expanded the island's sheep ranch and appointed Alberto Sánchez Manterola as its manager; Sánchez was also appointed the island's maritime sub-delegate. Merlet & Company, which employed one-fourth of the island's population, prohibited the display of the Rapa Nui flag and restricted the rights of the native population to the island's land and animals. The company persuaded the people to build a 3-metre-high (9.8 ft) wall around Hanga Roa and Moeroa, separating them from the ranch land and restricting them to the walled area.

Merlet wrote to Riro, calling him an impostor and ordering him to stop calling himself king because he (Merlet) owned the island. Despite beginning on good terms, company manager Sánchez did not respect Riro's authority either. In 1898, the king and his men unsuccessfully attempted to discuss wages and working conditions with Sánchez. In retaliation, the Rapa Nui refused to work until the next Chilean ship arrived and could arbitrate their case. Sánchez and his armed guards marched to Hanga Roa to force the strikers back to work; the islanders refused to comply with his order, disarming one of his men in the confrontation.

== Death and legacy ==
In response to the abuses, Riro ignored warnings from his people and went to Valparaíso in late 1898 or early 1899 to air his grievances to the Chilean government. Accompanying him on the company's ship, the Maria Luísa, were the Rapa Nui soldiers of the Chilean Army's Maipo Regiment: Juan Tepano Rano, Juan Araki Tiʻa, and José Pirivato. On the day of their arrival, the Valparaíso provincial intendant offered to forward Riro's case to the government; however, the king insisted on meeting as equals with Chilean president Federico Errázuriz Echaurren. The delegation was hosted by Merlet's men (Jeffries and Alfredo Rodríguez) at a local tavern, and the king was invited to stay with Rodríguez while the soldiers went to their barracks. During the evening, the king was encouraged to drink heavily; the next morning his men were informed that he had been sent to Carlos Van Buren Hospital, where he died of alcohol poisoning. News of his death did not reach the island until March 1899. Although Merlet said that the young king drank himself to death, Rapa Nui oral tradition asserts that he was poisoned on Merlet's orders while he was in the hospital. Riro was buried in a pauper's grave in Valparaíso.

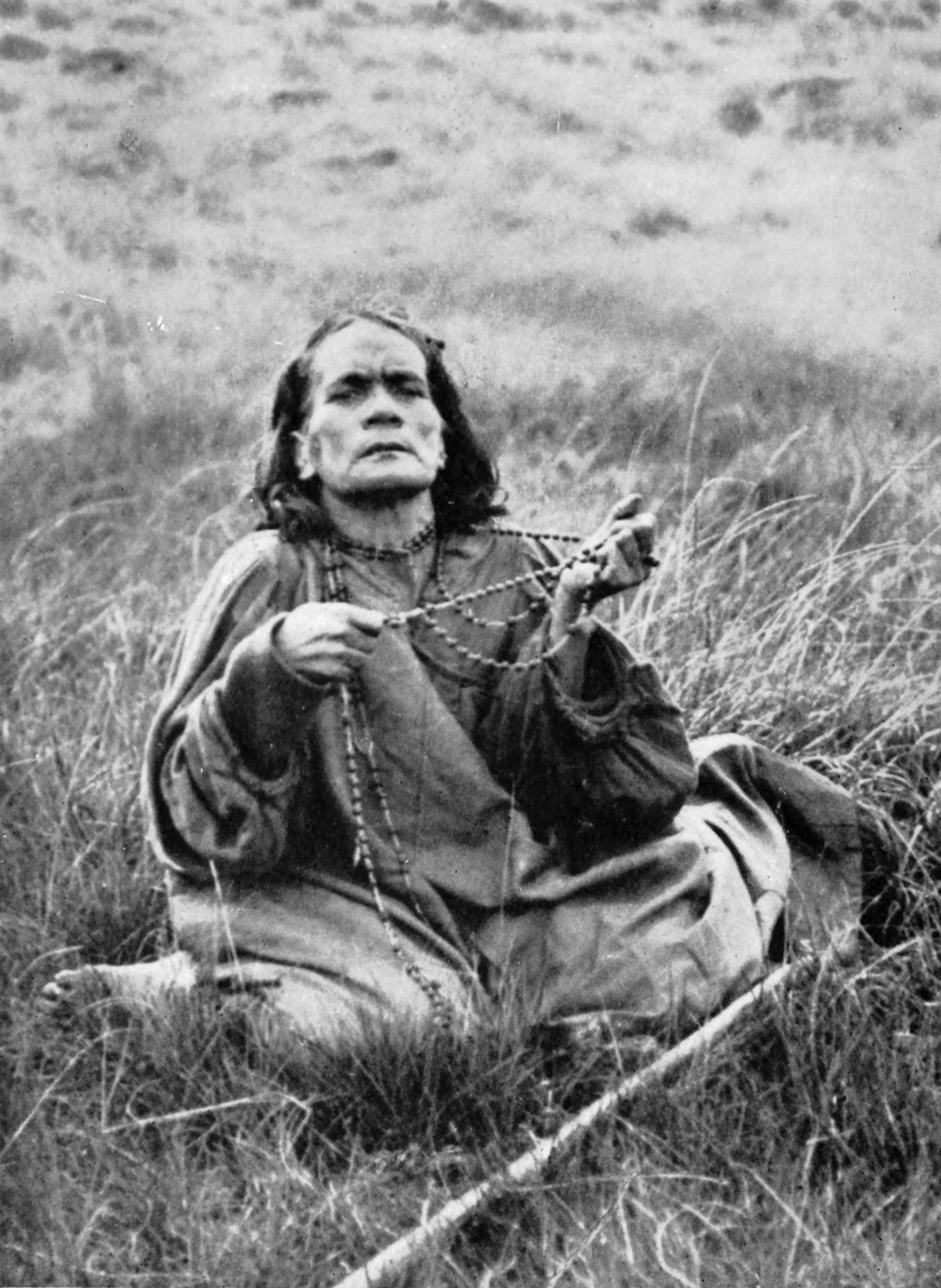
Riro's cousin, Angata, in 1914

After the king's death, Angata assumed nominal leadership of the Miru clan. Riro's relatives unsuccessfully attempted to restore the kingship with Enrique Ika and Moisés Tuʻu Hereveri, despite Sánchez's orders abrogating the institution and forbidding the islanders from choosing a new king. (Note: Enrique Ika was proclaimed king in January 1900, and Moisés Tuʻu Hereveri was elected in 1901 and ousted in 1902. Rapa Nui historian Cristián Moreno Pakarati noted that they have been unjustly forgotten by Rapa Nui historiography.) Fearing for her life, his widow Véronique married Manuel A. Vega, a Chilean shepherd, on 29 January 1900. In 1902, Chile appointed Juan Tepano as cacique in an attempt to end indigenous resistance. Angata led an unsuccessful 1914 revolt to overthrow the company's control, and an independence movement has continued on the island. Riro's grandson, Valentino Riroroko Tuki, declared himself king of Rapa Nui in 2011.

Chilean President Michelle Bachelet repatriated Riro's remains to Easter Island in 2006, when they were received in a ceremony where the Rapa Nui flag flew alongside the Chilean flag. His surviving grandchildren (Benedicto, Valentino, Milagrosa, Ambrosio, Luís and María) participated in the ceremony. A bust of the king was erected by the Chilean Navy in front of the governor's office at Hanga Roa.

== See also ==
- History of Easter Island

== Bibliography ==
- Fischer, Steven R. (2005). Island at the End of the World: The Turbulent History of Easter Island. London: Reaktion Books. ISBN 978-1-86189-245-4. OCLC 254147531.
- Gonschor, Lorenz (2007). Rapa Nui: Issues and Events, 1 July 2005 to 30 June 2006. Vol. 19. Honolulu: University of Hawaiʻi Press, Center for Pacific Islands Studies. pp. 240–247. hdl:10125/13991.
- Gonschor, Lorenz Rudolf (August 2008). Law as a Tool of Oppression and Liberation: Institutional Histories and Perspectives on Political Independence in Hawaiʻi, Tahiti Nui/French Polynesia and Rapa Nui (PDF) (MA thesis). Honolulu: University of Hawaii at Manoa. hdl:10125/20375. OCLC 798846333. Archived from the original (PDF) on 2 January 2020.
- Hotus, Alberto (1988). Te Mau hatu ʻo Rapa Nui. Santiago: Editorial Emisión. OCLC 123102513.
- McCall, Grant (September 1997). "Riro Rapu and Rapanui: Refoundations in Easter Island Colonial History" (PDF). Rapa Nui Journal. 11 (3). Los Ocos, CA: The Easter Island Foundation: 112–122. OCLC 197901224. Archived from the original (PDF) on 23 September 2014.
- Métraux, Alfred (June 1937). "The Kings of Easter Island". The Journal of the Polynesian Society. 46 (2). Wellington: The Polynesian Society: 41–62. JSTOR 20702667. OCLC 6015249623.
- Pakarati, Cristián Moreno (2015) [2010]. Los últimos 'Ariki Mau y la evolución del poder político en Rapa Nui.
- Pakarati, Cristián Moreno (2015). Rebelión, Sumisión y Mediación en Rapa Nui (1896-1915).

Government offices
Preceded by Atamu Tekena	King of Rapa Nui; 1892–1896	Chilean annexation
Titles in pretence
Chilean annexation	King of Rapa Nui; 1896–1898/1899	Succeeded by Enrique Ika
