= Juan Tepano =

Easter Island leader

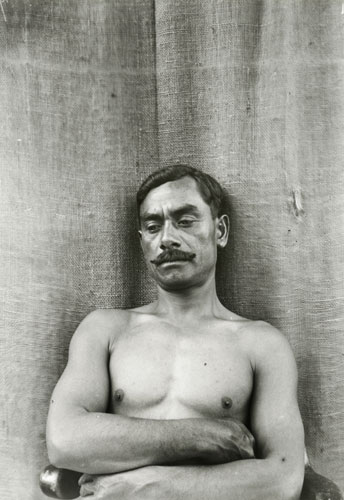
- Tepano in 1915
- Born: March 4, 1867; Kingdom of Rapa Nui
- Died: November 8, 1947 (aged 80); Easter Island, Chile
- Parents: Viriamo; Iovani Rano

Juan Tepano Rano ʻa Veri ʻAmo (4 March 1867 – 8 November 1947) was a Rapa Nui leader of Easter Island. He served as an informant for Chileans and Euro-American scholars on the culture and history of the island.

== Family ==
He was born on 4 March 1867 (Note: An alternative claim stated he was born in 1872 and died in 1938.) and was of full-blood Rapa Nui descent. His father was Iovani Rano. He was raised by his mother (sometimes referred to as his grandmother) Viriamo, who was born in 1830 and still remembered when the islanders were able to recite the Rongorongo script.

Originally named Tepano Rano, he later adopted Juan (what he was called while he was in Chile) as a first name and used his baptismal name Tepano (Stephen) as his surname. (Note: Another Easter Islander by the name of Tepano has been inaccurately identified with him, although this individual lived on Tahiti and possessed facial tattoos which were studied by Swedish ethnographer Hjalmar Stolpe in the 1880s during the Vanadis expedition. They were both named after Bishop of Tahiti Tepano Jaussen.) He was from the Tupahotu clan while his mother was of the Ureohei clan.

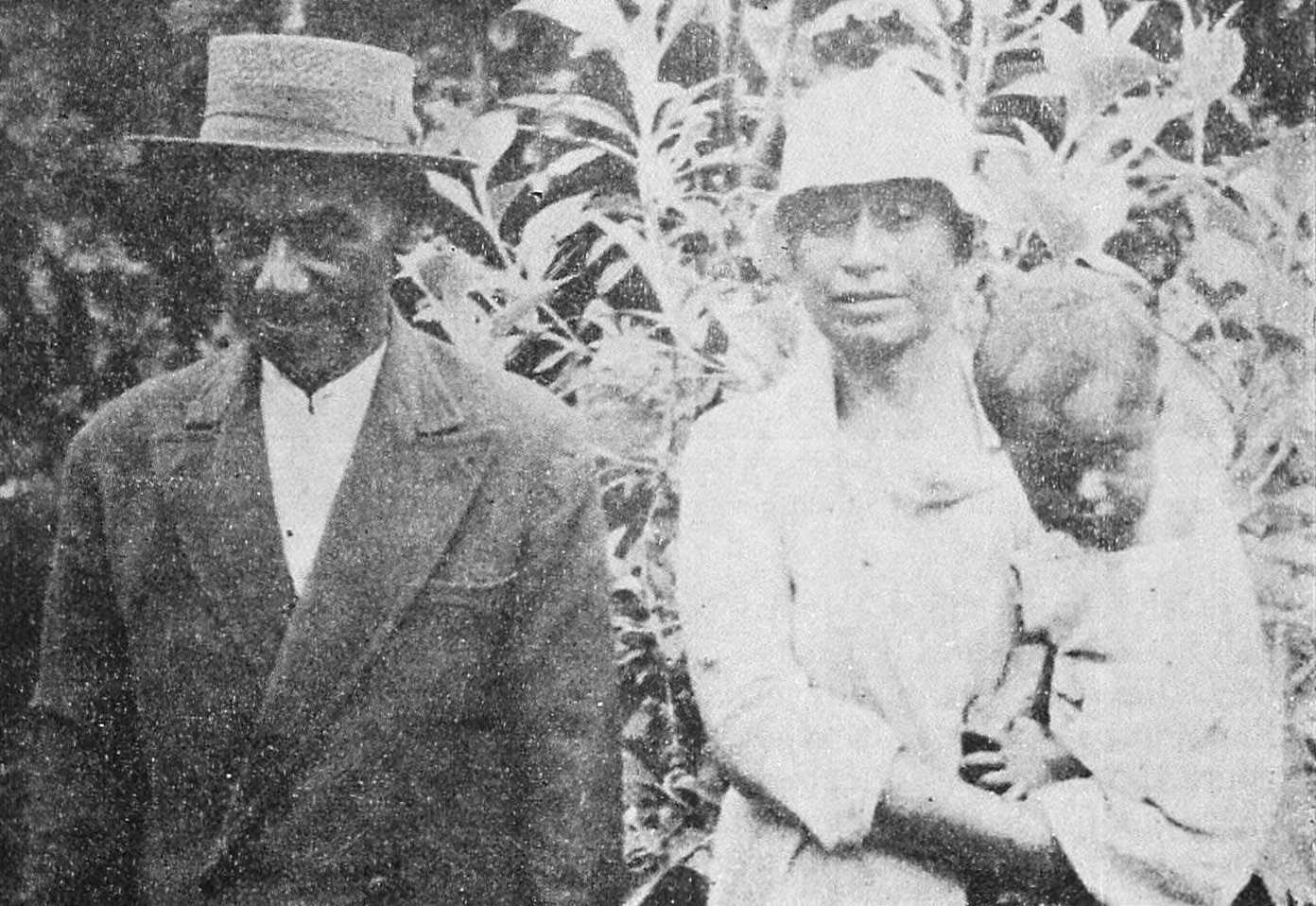
Juan Tepano, his wife María ‘Aifiti Engepito Ika Tetono, and their son

Tepano married María ‘Aifiti Engepito Ika Tetono, daughter of King Enrique Ika (r. 1900) and a member of the Miru clan.

== In Chile ==
Tepano accompanied the last Rapa Nui king Simeon Riro Kāinga to Valparaíso in late 1898 or early 1899 to air his grievances against the Enrique Merlet company, which owned much of the land with the Chilean government who had annexed Easter Island. He and two other Rapa Nui soldiers were traveling to Chile to join the Maipo Regiment of the Chilean Army. The delegation was hosted by Merlet's men Jeffries and Alfredo Rodríguez at a local tavern, where the king was induced to drink heavily. The king was invited to lodge with Rodríguez while the soldiers went to their barracks. On the following day, they were informed that the king had been sent to a hospital and died of alcohol poisoning. Merlet claimed that the young king drank himself to death, while Rapa Nui oral tradition asserts that he was poisoned on the orders of Merlet while he was at the hospital.

American anthropologist Grant McCall cast doubt on his military service, writing: "There is a nonsense story that he served in the Maipo regiment of the Chilean army in the War of the Pacific."

== Later life ==
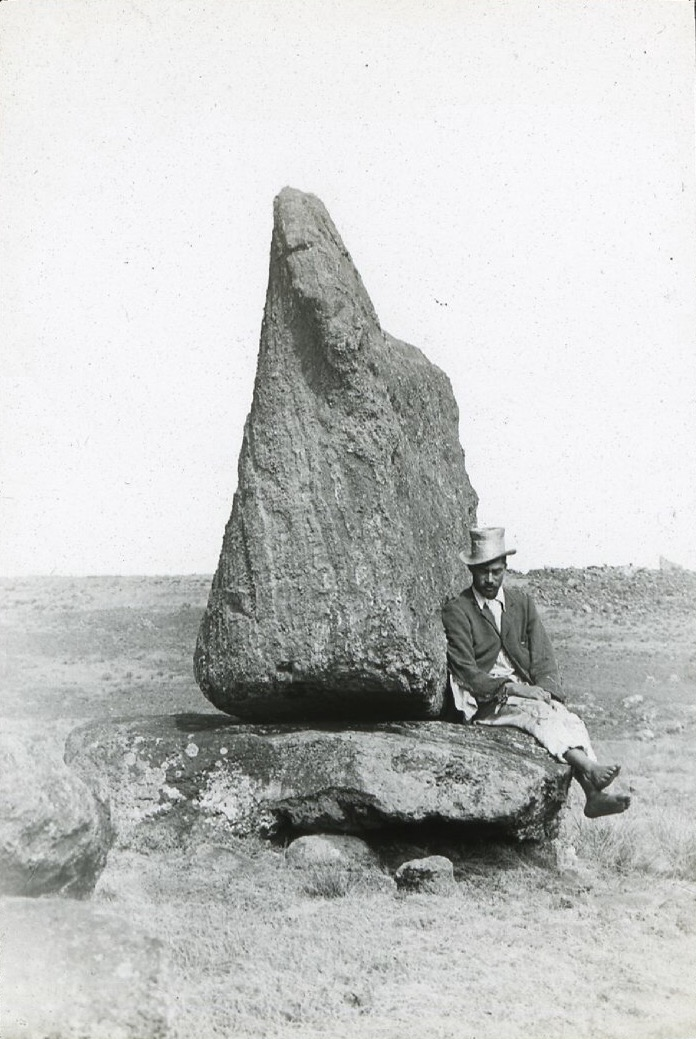
Juan Tepano sitting beside a broken moai at Ahu Tongariki

By 1901, Tepano had returned to Easter Island after serving in the Chilean Army. He was appointed by Henry Percy Edmunds, the company's manager and Chile's colonial subdelegado marítimo, as cacique, or village head in 1902. He would become the mediator for the indigenous community at Hanga Roa and the company's base at Mataveri. Officers of the Chilean Naval corvette Baquedano later attempted to proclaim him "king" in April 1911, but none of the islanders – including Tepano himself – took the ceremony seriously.

Tepano served as one of the informants and translator for the English anthropologist Katherine Routledge during her 1914–1915 Mana Expedition to Easter Island. He had a grasp of pidgin English and spoke a mixture of Spanish, English, Tahitian, and Rapa Nui. Routledge tried to learn Rongorongo from Tepano and the older islanders, but Tepano later admitted he had no knowledge of it while most of the other older residents had only secondhand knowledge of the mysterious script. It was noted that he had difficulty understanding Old Rapa Nui (the uncontaminated language spoken by the older generation) as well.

He also served as one of the informants for the Swiss anthropologist Alfred Métraux, who visited the island between 1934 and 1935.

Tepano died on 8 November 1947, at the age of 80.

== See also ==
- History of Easter Island

== Bibliography ==
- Englert, Sebastián (2004). La tierra de Hotu Matu'a: historia y etnología de la Isla de Pascua : gramática y diccionario del antiguo idioma de Isla de Pascua. Santiago: Editorial Universitaria. ISBN 978-956-11-1704-4. OCLC 223396603.
- Fischer, Steven R. (2005). Island at the End of the World: The Turbulent History of Easter Island. London: Reaktion Books. ISBN 978-1-86189-245-4. OCLC 254147531.
- Fischer, Steven R. (1997). Rongorongo: The Easter Island Script : History, Traditions, Texts. Oxford: Clarendon Press. ISBN 978-0-19-823710-5. OCLC 247739920.
- Gonschor, Lorenz Rudolf (August 2008). Law as a Tool of Oppression and Liberation: Institutional Histories and Perspectives on Political Independence in Hawaiʻi, Tahiti Nui/French Polynesia and Rapa Nui (PDF) (MA thesis). Honolulu: University of Hawaii at Manoa. hdl:10125/20375. OCLC 798846333. Archived from the original (PDF) on 2020-01-02.
- Kaeppler, Adrienne Lois (2001). "Rapa Nui Art and Aesthetics". In Kjellgren, Eric (ed.). Splendid Isolation: Art of Easter Island. New York: Metropolitan Museum of Art. ISBN 978-1-58839-011-0. OCLC 248631665.
- Krutak, Lars F. (2007). "Papua New Guinea and Easter Island". The Tattooing Arts of Tribal Women. London: Bennett & Bloom/Desert Hearts. pp. 101–126. ISBN 978-1-898948-75-9. OCLC 181068444.
- McCall, Grant (September 1997). "Riro Rapu and Rapanui: Refoundations in Easter Island Colonial History" (PDF). Rapa Nui Journal. 11 (3). Los Ocos, CA: The Easter Island Foundation: 112–122. OCLC 197901224. Archived from the original (PDF) on 2014-09-23.
- Métraux, Alfred (June 1937). "The Kings of Easter Island". The Journal of the Polynesian Society. 46 (2). Wellington: The Polynesian Society: 41–62. JSTOR 20702667. OCLC 6015249623.
- Pakarati, Cristián Moreno (2015) [2010]. Los últimos 'Ariki Mau y la evolución del poder político en Rapa Nui.
- Pakarati, Cristián Moreno (2015). Rebelión, Sumisión y Mediación en Rapa Nui (1896-1915).
- Pelta, Kathy (2001). Rediscovering Easter Island. Minneapolis: Lerner Publications. ISBN 978-0-8225-4890-4. OCLC 43977639.
- Routledge, Katherine (1919). The Mystery of Easter Island: The Story of an Expedition. London: Printed for the author by Hazell, Watson and Viney. OCLC 955343438.
- Stolpe, Hjalmar (1899). "Über die Tätowirung der Oster-Insulaner". Abhandlungen und Berichte des Königl. Zoologischen und Anthropologisch-Ethnographischen Museums zu Dresden. 8 (6). Berlin: R. Friedlaender: 1–13.
- Van Tilburg, JoAnne (2003). Among Stone Giants: The Life of Katherine Routledge and Her Remarkable Expedition to Easter Island. New York: Scribner. ISBN 978-0-7432-4480-0. OCLC 253375820.
