= Kingdom of Easter Island =

Polynesian kingdom ended in 1888

Kingdom of Rapa Nui Kāinga o Rapa Nui (Rapa Nui) Reino de Rapa Nui (Spanish)
- c. 4th century – 1888 / 1902
- Top: 1880–1899; Bottom: 1899–1902 Coat of arms

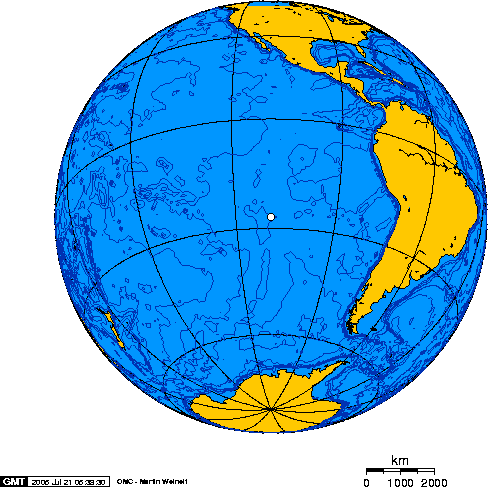
- Location of the Kingdom of Easter Island in the South Pacific
- Status: Independent Kingdom (until 1888); Chilean Protectorate (1888–1902)
- Capital: Anakena
- Common languages: Rapanui, later Chilean Spanish
- Government: Monarchy
- Monarch
  - c. 400: Hotu Matuꞌa
  - 1892–1899: Rokoroko He Tau
- History
  - Settled: 300–400 CE
  - Annexed to Chile: September 9, 1888
- Today part of: Chile -Easter Island

Easter Island was traditionally ruled by a monarchy, with a king as its leader. The monarchy of Easter Island lasted more than a millennia, before it was annexed by Chile in 1888, and became a Province of Chile in 1964.

== First paramount chief ==
The legendary, first chief of Easter Island is said to have been Hotu Matuꞌa, whose arrival has been dated in the 4th, 6th or 9th century AD. Legend insists that this man was the chief of a tribe that lived on Marae Renga. The Marae Renga is said to have existed in a place known as the "Hiva region". Some books suggest that the Hiva region was an area in the Marquesas Islands, but today, it is believed that the ancestral land of the Easter Islanders would have been located in the Pitcairn Mangareva intercultural zone. Some versions of the story claim that internal conflicts drove Hotu Matuꞌa to sail with his tribe for new land, while others say a natural disaster (possibly a tidal wave) caused the tribe to flee.

Despite these differences, the stories do agree on the next part: A priest named Haumaka appeared to Hotu Matuꞌa in his dreams one night. The priest flew out to sea and discovered an island, which he called Te Pito ꞌo te Kāinga ("The Center of the Earth"). Sending seven scouts, Hotu Matuꞌa embraced his dream and awaited the return of his scouts. After eating, planting yams, and resting, the seven scouts returned home to tell of the good news. Hotu Matuꞌa took a large crew, his family, and everything they needed to survive in the new land. Then, they rowed a single huge, double-hulled canoe to "The Center of the Earth" and landed at Anakena, Rapa Nui (Easter Island).

== Tuꞌu ko Iho ==
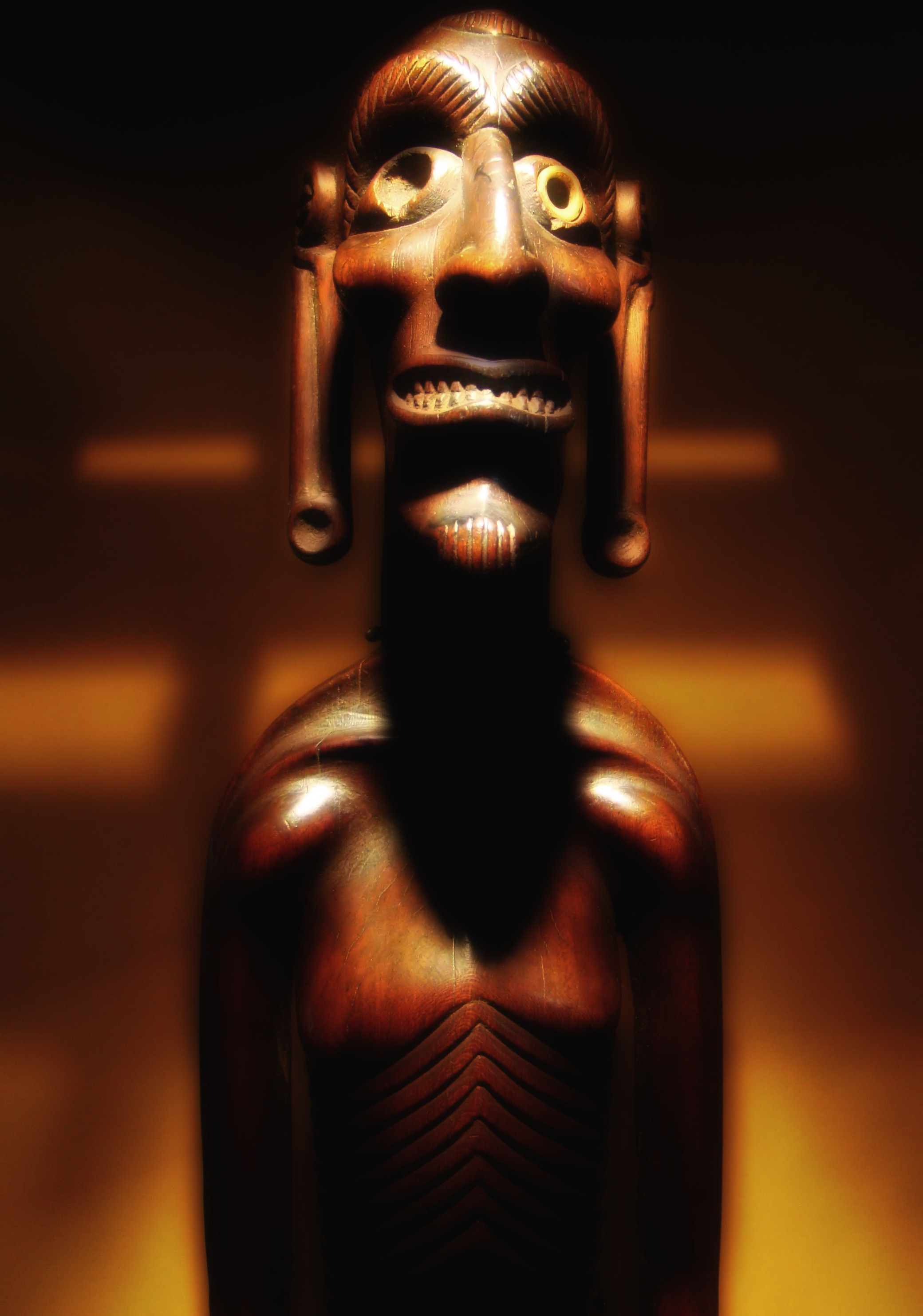
Example of statues related to the mythology of Tuꞌu ko Iho, from Australian National Maritime Museum.

According to Steven Roger Fischer's Island at the End of the World, a certain individual named Tuꞌu ko Iho co-founded the settlement on the island. Fischer's book claims he not only did this, but a legend says he "brought the statues to the island and caused them to walk".

== Children of Hotu Matuꞌa ==
Shortly before the death of Hotu Matuꞌa, the island was given to his children, who formed eight main clans. In addition, four smaller and less important clans were formed.

1. Tuꞌu Maheke: the firstborn son of Hotu. He received the lands between Anakena and Maunga Tea-Tea.
2. Miru: received the lands between Anakena and Hanga Roa.
3. Marama: received the lands between Anakena and Rano Raraku. Having access to the Rano Raraku quarry proved extremely useful for those living in Marama's lands. The quarry soon became the island's main source of tuff used in the construction of the moai (large stone statues). In fact, 95% of the moai were made in Rano Raraku.
4. Raa settled to the northwest of Maunga Tea-Tea.
5. Koro Orongo made a settlement between Akahanga and Rano Raraku.
6. Hotu Iti was given the whole eastern part of the island.
7. and 8. Tupahotu and Ngaure were left with the remaining parts of the island.

== Royal patterns throughout Easter Island ==
Over the years, the clans slowly grouped together into two territories. The Ko Tuꞌu Aro were composed of clans in the northwest, while the Hotu Iti were mainly living in the southeast part of the island. The Miru are very commonly seen as the true royal heirs who ruled the Ko Tuꞌu Aro clans.

Since then, leaders of Easter Island have been hereditary rulers who claimed divine origin and separated themselves from the rest of the islanders with taboos. These ariki not only controlled religious functions in the clan, but also ran everything else, from managing food supplies to waging war. Ever since Easter Island was divided into two super-clans, the rulers of Easter Island followed a predictable pattern. The people of Rapa Nui were especially competitive during those times. They usually competed to build a bigger moai than their neighbors, but when this failed to resolve the conflict, the tribes often turned to war and throwing down each other's statues.

== Lists of the paramount chiefs and historical kings of Easter Island ==
- 1. Hotu (A Matua), son of Matua (c. 400)
- 2. Vakai, his wife
- 3. Tuu ma Heke
- 4. Nuku (Inukura?)
- 5. Miru a Tumaheke
- 6. Hata a Miru
- 7. Miru o Hata
- 8. Hiuariru (Hiu a Miru?)
- 9. Aturaugi. The first obsidian spearheads were used.
- 10. Raa
- 11. Atahega a Miru (descendant of Miru?), around 600
- ......Hakapuna?
- 17. Ihu an Aturanga (Oihu?)
- ......Ruhoi?
- 20. Tuu Ka(u)nga te Mamaru
- 21. Takahita
- 22. Ouaraa, around 800
- 23. Koroharua
- 24. Mahuta Ariiki (the first stone images were made in his son's time)
- 25. Atua Ure Rangi
- 26. Atuamata
- 27. Uremata
- 28. Te Riri Tuu Kura
- 29. Korua Rongo
- 30. Tiki Te Hatu
- 31. Tiki Tena
- 32. Uru Kenu, around 1000
- 33. Te Rurua Tiki Te Hatu
- 34. Nau Ta Mahiki
- 35. Te Rika Tea
- 36. Te Teratera
- 37. Te Ria Kautahito (Hirakau-Tehito?)
- 38. Ko Te Pu I Te Toki
- 39. Kuratahogo
- 40. Ko Te Hiti Rua Nea
- 41. Te Uruaki Kena
- 42. Tu Te Rei Manana, around 1200
- 43. Ko Te Kura Tahonga
- 44. Taoraha Kaihahanga
- 45. Tukuma(kuma)
- 46. Te Kahui Tuhunga
- 47. Te Tuhunga Hanui
- 48. Te Tuhunga Haroa
- 49. Te Tuhunga "Mare Kapeau"
- 50. Toati Rangi Hahe
- 51. Tangaroa Tatarara (Maybe Tangaiia of Mangaia Island ?)
- 52. Havini(vini) Koro (or Hariui Koro), about 1400
- 53. Puna Hako
- 54. Puna Ate Tuu
- 55. Puna Kai Te Vana
- 56. Te Riri Katea (? – 1485)
- 57. N/A
- 58. N/A
- 59. Haumoana, Tarataki and Tupa Ariki (from Peru), from 1485
- 60. Mahaki Tapu Vae Iti (Mahiki Tapuakiti)
- 61. Ngau-ka Te Mahaki or Tuu Koiho (Ko-Tuu-ihu?)
- 62. Anakena
- 63. Hanga Rau
- 64. Marama Ariki, around 1600
- 65. Riu Tupa Hotu (Nui Tupa Hotu?)
- 66. Toko Te Rangi (Perhaps the "God" Rongo of Mangaia Island?)
- 67. Kao Aroaro (Re Kauu?)
- 68. Mataivi
- 69. Kao Hoto
- 70. Te Ravarava (Terava Rara)
- 71. Tehitehuke
- 72. Te Rahai or Terahai

(The alternative rulers after Terahai: Koroharua, Riki-ka-atea, whose son was Hotu Matua, then Kaimakoi, Tehetu-tara-Kura, Huero, Kaimakoi (or Raimokaky), finally Gaara who is Ngaara on the main list below.)

- 73. Te Huke
- 74. Tuu, from Mata Nui (Ko Tuu?), around 1770
- 75. Hotu Iti (born from Mata Iti). War around 1773.
- 76. Honga
- 77. Te Kena
- 78. Te Tite Anga Henua
- 79. Nga'ara (c. 1835 – just before 1860), son of King Kai Mako'i
- 80. Maurata (1859 – 1862)
- 81. Kai Mako'i 'Iti (= Small Kaimakoi) (– 1863), son of Nga'ara, devastation of island by Peruvian slavers in the great Peruvian slaving raid of 1862, died as a slave (in 1863?)
- 82. Tepito
- 83. Gregorio; i. e. Kerekorio Manu Rangi, Rokoroko He Tau
- 84. Atamu Tekena, signs Treaty of Annexation, Easter Island is annexed, died August 1892
- 85. Simeon Riro Kāinga, died in Valparaíso, Chile in 1899
- 86. Enrique Ika a Tuʻu Hati (1900–1901), not recognized
- 87. Moisés Tuʻu Hereveri (1901–1902), not recognized.

Modern claimants

- 2011–2017: Valentino Riroroko Tuki, (crowned July, proclaimed 8 August 2011) grandson of Simeon Riro Kāinga.

== See also ==
- Hotu Matu'a
- King Nga'ara
- Rapa Nui
- Rapa Nui mythology
