= Valentino Riroroko Tuki =

Titular King of Rapa Nui
- Reign: 8 August 2011–29 July 2017
- Predecessor: Riro Kāinga (last generally recognized king); Moisés Tuʻu Hereveri (last elected king)
- Born: 13 February 1932; Easter Island, Chile
- Died: 29 July 2017 (aged 85); Easter Island, Chile
- Burial: Hanga Ohio
- Spouse: Andrea Servia Laharoa (m. 1953)
- Father: Juan Riroroko
- Mother: Luisa Tuki
- Religion: Catholic

Valentino Riroroko Tuki (13 February 1932 — 29 July 2017) was a claimant to the Rapa Nui throne of Easter Island. He was the grandson of the last King Simeón Riro Kāinga, who died in 1899 and belonged to the Miru clan, descendants of the founder and first Ariki Mau of Rapa Nui, the legendary Hotu Matua.

== Biography ==
Riroroko was born on 13 February 1932 in Easter Island. He was the son of Juan Riroroko, the youngest son of Riro Kāinga, and Luisa Tuki. He married Andrea Servia in 1953.

As eldest grandson of the last King of Rapa Nui, the title belonged to Jacobo Riroroko, who being of old age and bedridden with an illness, passed it to his younger brother Valentino Riroroko. The younger Riroroko was crowned King on August 8, 2011, in an official ceremony before the Rapanui Town Hall in the presence of the local Governor representing the Chilean government. The Rapa Nui Parliament, a local organism not recognized by the Chilean government, used this in their favor to try and coerce both Riroroko and the Chilean government to meet their agenda of independence, often speaking on behalf of the King without his permission.

Continuing the fight of his ancestors, Riroroko advanced the position Easter Island should be its own country separate from Chile. Writing for the Griffith Journal of Law & Human Dignity, Leonardo A. Crippa writes, "While Riroroko’s coronation could be seen as merely symbolic, it may prove critical to the Rapa Nui Nation’s overall efforts to rebuild its government and regain control of its territory."

Styles of Valentino Riroroko Tuki, Ariki of Rapa Nui
- Reference style: His Majesty
- Spoken style: Your Majesty

Riroroko appeared in the 2014 documentary Treasures Decoded: Easter Island Heads, in which he asks for the return of the Hoa Hakananai'a from the British Museum.

He died on 29 July 2017 and is buried in Miru clan territory next to Ahu Tereruti, the ceremonial platform belonging to his great-grandfather. His wife Andrea died two years later, in 2019.
