= Atamu Tekena =

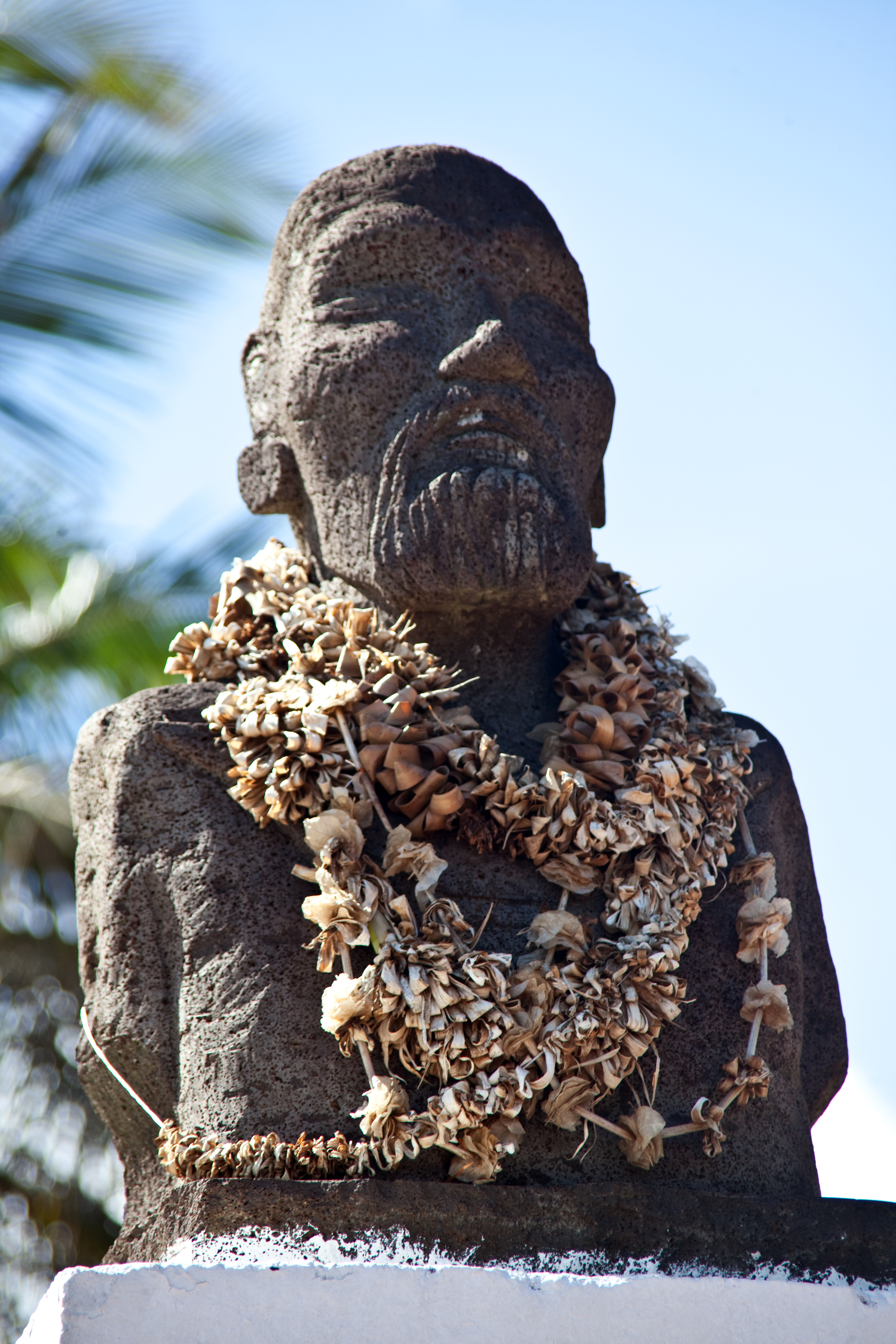
- Bust of Atamu Tekena, located at a central plaza at the island capital of Hanga Roa

King of Rapa Nui
- Reign: 1883–1892
- Predecessor: Council of State
- Successor: Riro Kāinga
- Born: c. 1850
- Died: August 1892
- Spouse: Ana Eva Hei Vehi
Names
- Atamu Maurata Te Kena ʻAo Tahi
- Religion: Roman Catholicism

Atamu Tekena or Atamu te Kena, full name Atamu Maurata Te Kena ʻAo Tahi (c. 1850 – August 1892) was the penultimate ‘Ariki or King of Rapa Nui (i.e. Easter Island) from 1883 until his death. (Note: Although Atamu Tekena and his predecessor Riro Kāinga held the title of King, their actual power and legitimacy are in doubt when compared to their predecessors. Historian Alfred Métraux noted, Although the islanders of to-day speak of the late kings, Atamu Te Kena and Riroroko, as if they were really kings, informants make it clear that they had very little in common with the ariki of olden days. Their power was of an indefinite, dubious nature, and they seem to have enjoyed none of the prerogatives of former ariki. Perhaps their only claim to the title lay in their descent-line; both belonged to the Miru group. Possibly if native civilization had continued, they might have been true kings. Personal pretension, supported by Chilean officers who needed a responsible intermediary to deal with the population, might have contributed toward the restoration of power to this fictitious and ephemeral royalty. — Métraux 1937, p. 42) In 1888, he signed a treaty of annexation ceding Easter Island to Chile in a ceremony officiated by Captain Policarpo Toro. His name is translated as "Adam the Gannet".

== Life and reign ==
He was born around 1850 as an extended member of the Miru clan, traditionally associated with the native kingship (ariki mau). Due to Peruvian slave raiding and the decimation of the native Rapa Nui population by introduced diseases, the population of Easter Island had dropped to 110 individuals by 1877. In 1864, the French Picpus missionaries established themselves on the island and converted many of the Rapa Nui people to Christianity. The last recognized ‘ariki mau Kerekorio Manu Rangi died in a tuberculosis epidemic in 1867.

After this social upheaval, a Council of State was established under the leadership of French adventurer and sheep rancher Jean-Baptiste Dutrou-Bornier who asserted more and more control and expelled the Catholic missionaries. He installed his wife Koreto as the unrecognized "Queen" of the island and unsuccessfully petitioned France for protectorate status.

Dutrou-Bornier was assassinated in 1876 and the Roman Catholic mission returned. His business interest was inherited by the Anglo-Jewish-Tahitian Prince Alexander Ariipaea Salmon who managed a sheep ranch which constituted much of the land on the island. Salmon ruled in all but name. The reestablished mission set up a new native government based on the indigenous district councils of Tahiti. At the instigation of Bishop Tepano Jaussen of Tahiti, Atamu was appointed by Father Hippolyte Roussel as King in 1883 to represent their interest alongside two to‘opae (councillors) and two judges. He adopted the additional name Maurata after the ariki mau who had died during the Peruvian slave raids. Unlike his predecessors, Atamu was not considered a member of the traditional royal patrilineal line and held little political power.

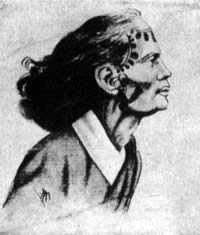
Ana Eva Hei Vehi, profile view by Walter Knoche, 1911

He married Ana Eva Hei (Uka ʻa Hei ʻa ʻArero), sometimes known as "Queen Eva", who was one of the last Rapa Nui people to have been tattooed in the traditional ways. They had six children including their eldest son Atamu “Hango” Tekena Hei.

=== Annexation to Chile ===
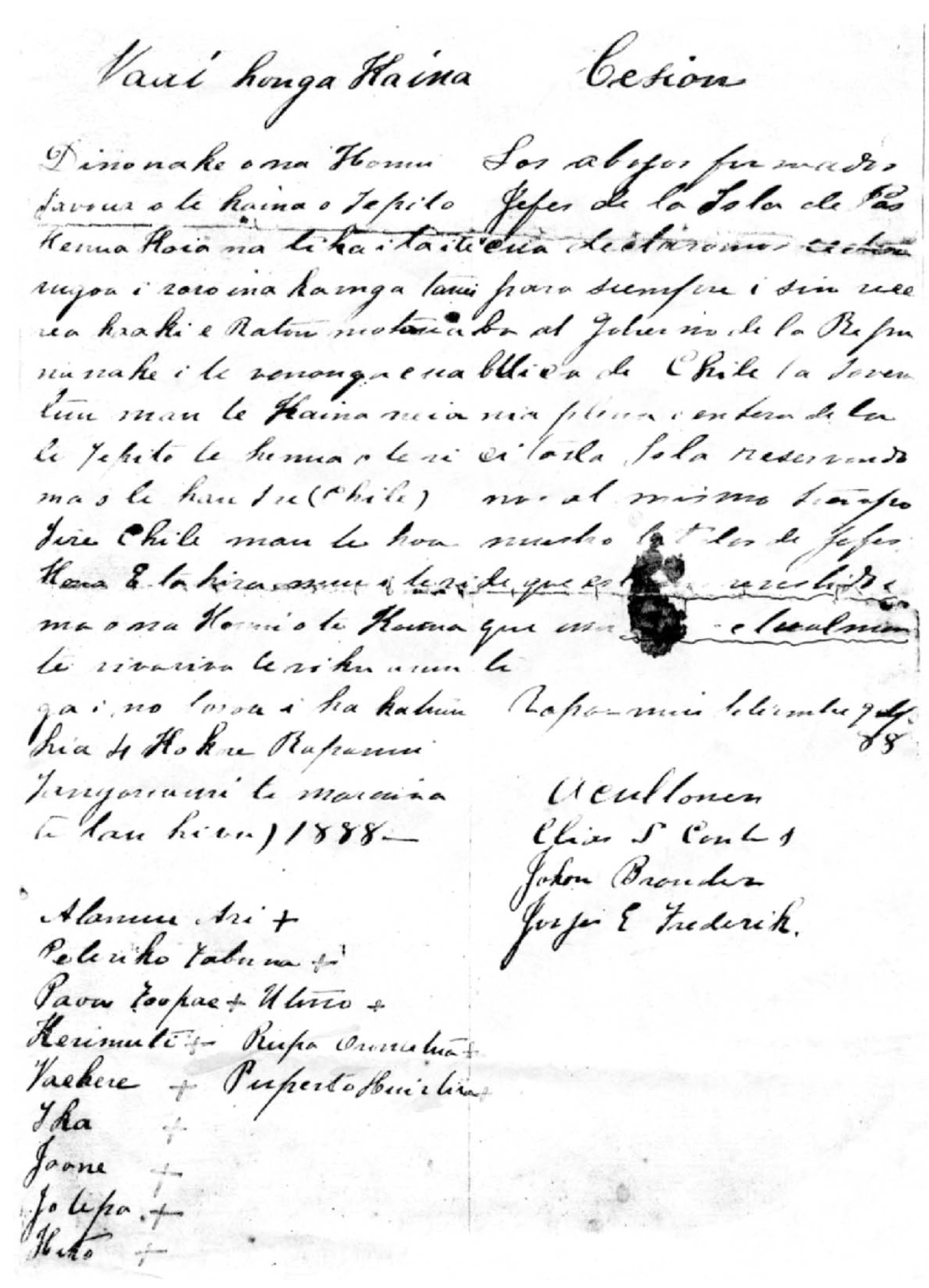
The 1888 Rapa Nui-Chile annexation treaty with Tahitian and Rapa Nui translation on the left and Spanish translation on the right

In 1887, Captain Policarpo Toro was sent by the government of Chile to purchase Salmon's sheep ranch and negotiate the annexation the island from the Catholic mission authority in Tahiti. Toro landed in Easter Island the following year and on 9 September 1888, Atamu and eleven chiefs signed a treaty of annexation ceding the island to Chile. During the annexation ceremony, Atamu gave Toro a handful of grass to feed his livestock and took a handful of dirt and put it in his jacket, staking his people's sovereign claim to the land.

Historian Lorenz Gonschor questions the authenticity of the annexation treaty due to the ambiguity of the bilingual versions. The Rapa Nui language version only made Chile the island's protector while the Spanish language version ceded the island's sovereignty in perpetuity. Despite the fact missionaries had been educating the islanders for more than twenty years, none of the chiefs signed their names to the document and merely wrote "+" next to their names. The treaty was also never ratified by Chile. Gonschor noted:

During the annexation ceremony, King Atamu Tekena gave Toro a bunch of grass while he put a handful of soil in his pocket, underlining his understanding of giving to Chile only the right to use the land, but not the land itself. It is also said that the Chilean flag was hoisted beneath the Rapanui flag on the same flagpole, thus acknowledging the sovereign status of the island's native government.

Captain Toro set up a colony with his brother Pedro Pablo Toro as the agent of colonization. The Rapa Nui people seemed oblivious to the take over; they believed they had only become a protectorate and still retain their independence. This Chilean colony co-existed and consulted with the native government and Atamu and his chiefs retained their titles. The colony was temporarily abandoned in 1892 after political unrest in Chile prompted many colonists to return to the mainland. Atamu died in August 1892. After his death, the Rapa Nui people elected Simeon Riro Kāinga as the next king.

== Legacy ==
The island's main avenue, Avenida Atamu Tekena, in Hanga Roa, was renamed in 1998 after the 19th-century king. It was previously named Avenida Policarpo Toro after the Chilean captain who initiated the annexation of Easter Island. A bust of the king was created in 2000 by Rapa Nui artist Tebo Pakarati and placed next to an older bust of Captain Toro in the Plaza Policarpo Toro, the main square of Hanga Roa.

== See also ==
- History of Easter Island

== Bibliography ==
- Aliaga, José Miguel Ramírez (2008). "Historia: El fin del aislamiento" (PDF). Rapa Nui: El Ombligo del Mundo. Santiago: Museo Chileno de Arte Precolombino. ISBN 9789562430579. OCLC 495712676.
- Delsing, Riet (2015). Articulating Rapa Nui: Polynesian Cultural Politics in a Latin American Nation-State. Honolulu: University of Hawaii Press. ISBN 978-0-8248-5461-4. OCLC 1013946134.
- Fischer, Steven R. (2005). Island at the End of the World: The Turbulent History of Easter Island. London: Reaktion Books. pp. 128, 132, 142, 143, 147, 248, 251. ISBN 978-1-86189-245-4. OCLC 254147531.
- Gonschor, Lorenz Rudolf (August 2008). Law as a Tool of Oppression and Liberation: Institutional Histories and Perspectives on Political Independence in Hawaiʻi, Tahiti Nui/French Polynesia and Rapa Nui (PDF) (MA thesis). Honolulu: University of Hawaii at Manoa. hdl:10125/20375. OCLC 798846333. Archived from the original (PDF) on 2 January 2020.
- Krutak, Lars F. (2007). "Papua New Guinea and Easter Island". The Tattooing Arts of Tribal Women. London: Bennett & Bloom/Desert Hearts. pp. 101–126. ISBN 978-1-898948-75-9. OCLC 181068444.
- McCall, Grant (September 1997). "Riro Rapu and Rapanui: Refoundations in Easter Island Colonial History" (PDF). Rapa Nui Journal. 11 (3). Los Ocos, CA: The Easter Island Foundation: 112–122. OCLC 197901224. Archived from the original (PDF) on 23 September 2014.
- Métraux, Alfred (June 1937). "The Kings of Easter Island". The Journal of the Polynesian Society. 46 (2). Wellington: The Polynesian Society: 41–62. JSTOR 20702667. OCLC 6015249623.
- Pakarati, Cristián Moreno (2015) [2010]. Los últimos 'Ariki Mau y la evolución del poder político en Rapa Nui.
- Pakarati, Cristián Moreno (2015). Rebelión, Sumisión y Mediación en Rapa Nui (1896–1915).
- Peiser, Benny (1 July 2005). "From Genocide to Ecocide: The Rape of Rapa Nui". Energy & Environment. 16 (3&4). Brentwood, Essex: Multi-Science Pub. Co.: 513–540. Bibcode:2005EnEnv..16..513P. doi:10.1260/0958305054672385. OCLC 109372933. S2CID 155079232.

Government offices
Preceded by Council of State	King of Rapa Nui; 1882–1892	Riro Kāinga
