= Ngaꞌara =

Chief of Easter Island

- ꞌAriki
- Reign: ca 1835–1859
- Predecessor: Kai Makoꞌi
- Successor: Kai Makoꞌi ꞌIti
- Died: 1859
- Issue: Kai Makoꞌi ꞌIti
- Father: Kai Makoꞌi

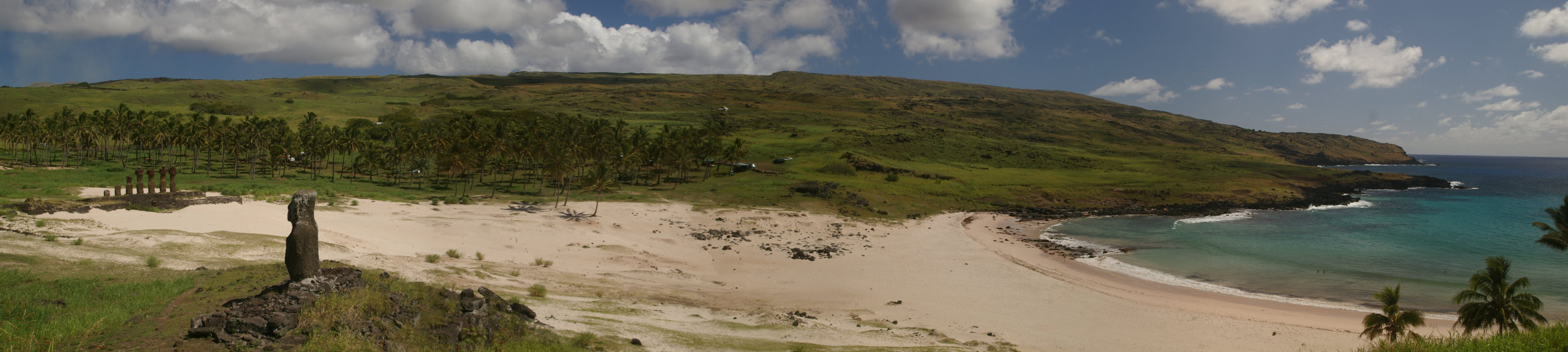
Anakena, where Ngaꞌara held his annual rongorongo festival.

Ngaꞌara (Note: The name Ngaꞌara has been variously spelled Gnaara, Gaara, Ngaara, Nga-Ara, Gahara, and Gobara. The letter g is a common convention in the Pacific for the ng-sound [ŋ], and Roussel, the one who transcribed the name as Gahara, frequently used h for glottal stop. Gobara may have been a typo for Gahara. Routledge's informants, some of whom had known the king, supported a pronunciation of [ŋaʔaɾa] Ngaꞌara.) (reigned from the death of his father, Kai Makoꞌi ca. 1835 to his own death just before 1860) was the last great ꞌariki, or paramount chief, of Easter Island, and the last master of rongorongo, the Easter Island script.

== Biography ==
Before becoming king, Ngaꞌara ran a hare rongorongo (rongorongo school) at ꞌAnakena Bay. Generally fathers would teach their sons and any other boys who were interested, and Ngaꞌara was the most famous teacher on the island. Boys would study three to five months to learn rongorongo.

At the time he became ꞌariki, the real power on the island lay in the Birdman priests of ꞌOrongo. One of the sacred responsibilities of the tuhunga tā (scribes and reciters of rongorongo) seems to have been the recitation or chanting of rongorongo tablets at ꞌOrongo during the annual Birdman ceremonies. That quarter of the village was off limits to everyone else during the ceremonies. Ngaꞌara sent students, but did not himself attend.

Rongorongo was considered to contain mana (sacred power). For example, chanting a timo (vengeance) tablet could release supernatural powers to kill a murderer. A woman would carry a pure (fertility) tablet while the scribes chanted it to increase her fertility. Tablets were used to increase crops or a catch of fish. Katherine Routledge was told that one of Ngaꞌara's tablets, called Kouhau ꞌo te Ranga and thought to be Rongorongo text C, was one of a kind and had the power to "give conquest in war" and enslave the conquered.

In order to take control of the island from the Birdman priests of ꞌOrongo, Ngaꞌara established an annual rongorongo festival at ꞌAnakena. Rather than using the tablets for specific ends, it was a festival for the tablets themselves, and it became the most important assembly in pre-missionary times:

The people were assembled at Anakena Bay once each year to hear all of the tablets read. The feast of the tablets was regarded as their most important fête day, and not even war was allowed to interfere with it.

— Thomson (1891:514)

Hundreds attended these festivals. Heuheu staves were brought by all and stuck in the ground where the attendee stood. The tablets were recited from dawn to dusk, with a break for dinner. Ngaꞌara presented the reciters with veri tapa cloths. Since the mana of the tablets went through him at this festival, Ngaꞌara was able to assert spiritual primacy over the island.

When Ngaꞌara died, his son Kai Makoꞌi ꞌIti (Kai Makoꞌi Jr) took over the festival at ꞌAnakena for three years, until he was captured in the great Peruvian slaving raid of 1862. Although the slaves were freed the next year, Kai Makoꞌi did not survive to return.

== Bibliography ==
- Fisher, Steven Roger (1997). RongoRongo, the Easter Island Script: History, Traditions, Texts. Oxford and New York: Oxford University Press. ISBN 0-19-823710-3.
- van Hoorebeeck, Albert (1979) La vérité sur l'île de Pâques. Le Havre. (in French)
- Métraux, Alfred (1937) The Kings of Easter Island. Bishop Museum
