= Katherine Routledge =

British archaeologist

Katherine Maria Pease Routledge
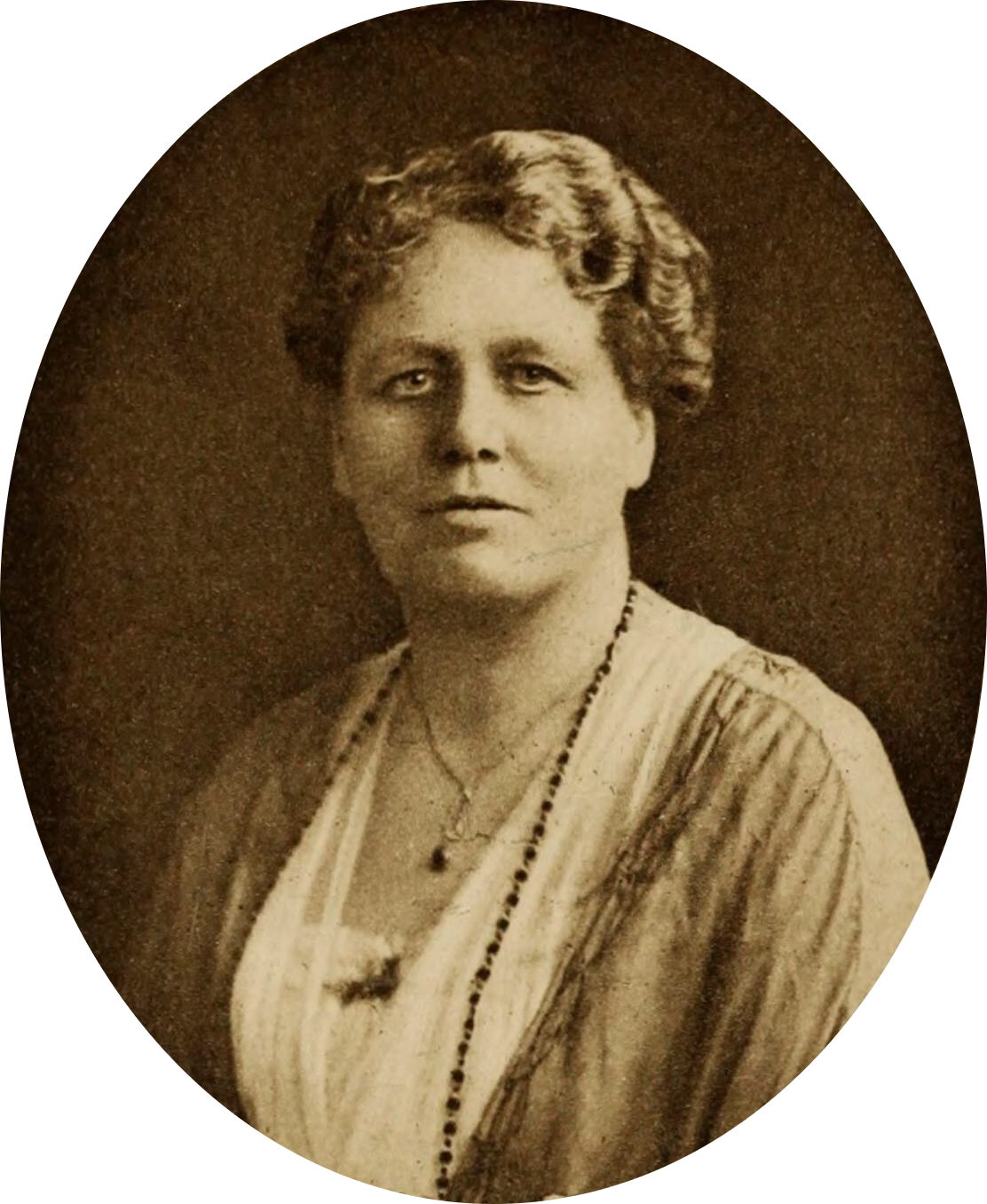
- Routledge in 1919
- Born: 11 August 1866; Darlington, England
- Died: 13 December 1935 (aged 69); Ticehurst, England
- Education: Somerville College, Oxford
- Scientific career
- Fields: Archeology

Katherine Maria Routledge (/ˈraʊtlɛdʒ/ ROWT-lej; née Pease; 11 August 1866 – 13 December 1935) was an English archaeologist and anthropologist who, in 1914, initiated and carried out much of the first true survey of Easter Island.

She was the second child of Kate and Gurney Pease, and was born into a wealthy Quaker family in Darlington, County Durham, northern England. She graduated from Somerville Hall (now Somerville College, Oxford), with Honours in Modern History in 1895, and for a while taught courses through the Extension Division and at Darlington Training College. After the Second Boer War, she traveled to South Africa with a committee to investigate the resettlement of single working women from England to South Africa. In 1906 she married William Scoresby Routledge. The couple went to live among the Kikuyu people of what was then British East Africa, and in 1910 jointly published a book of their research entitled With A Prehistoric People.

== Easter Island ==
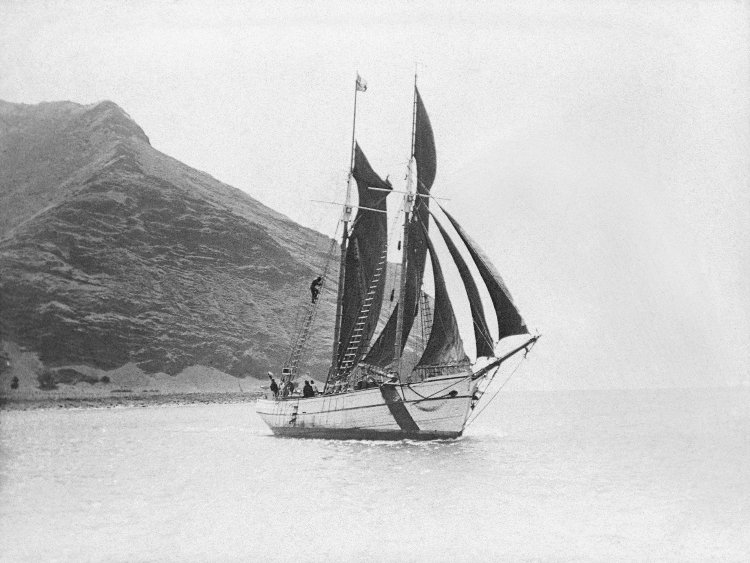
The Mana at Easter Island, 1914.

In 1910 the Routledges decided to organize their own expedition to Easter Island/Rapa Nui. They had a state-of-the-art 90-foot (27 m) long Schooner built and named it Mana. They affiliated with the British Association for the Advancement of Science, the British Museum and the Royal Geographical Society, recruited a crew and borrowed an officer from the Royal Navy. The Mana departed Falmouth on 25 March 1913.

They arrived on Easter Island on 29 March 1914. They established two base camps, one in the area of Mataveri and the other at the statue quarry, Rano Raraku and also explored Orongo and Anakena. With the help of an islander named Juan Tepano, Routledge proceeded to interview the natives and catalogue the moai (giant statues) and the Ahus they had once stood on. They excavated over 30 moai, visited the tribal elders in their leper colony north of Hanga Roa and recorded various legends and oral histories including that of Hotu Matua, the Birdman cult, clan names and territories and data on the enigmatic rongorongo script; Van Tilburg credits her with a primary role in assisting preservation of Rapa Nui's indigenous Polynesian culture.

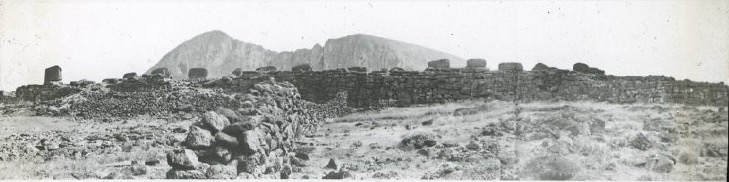
The excavated Ahu Tongariki, 1914. At the time, all moai were still overturned and there were no palm trees on the island.

One of her findings was the cultural continuity between the statue carvers and the Polynesian Rapa Nui people resident on the island in her time; the designs carved on the backs of the statues she excavated included the same designs tattooed on the backs and posteriors of elderly islanders in the island's leper colony. As the tattooing tradition had been suppressed by missionaries in the 1860s this particular primary evidence was unavailable to later expeditions except through her records.

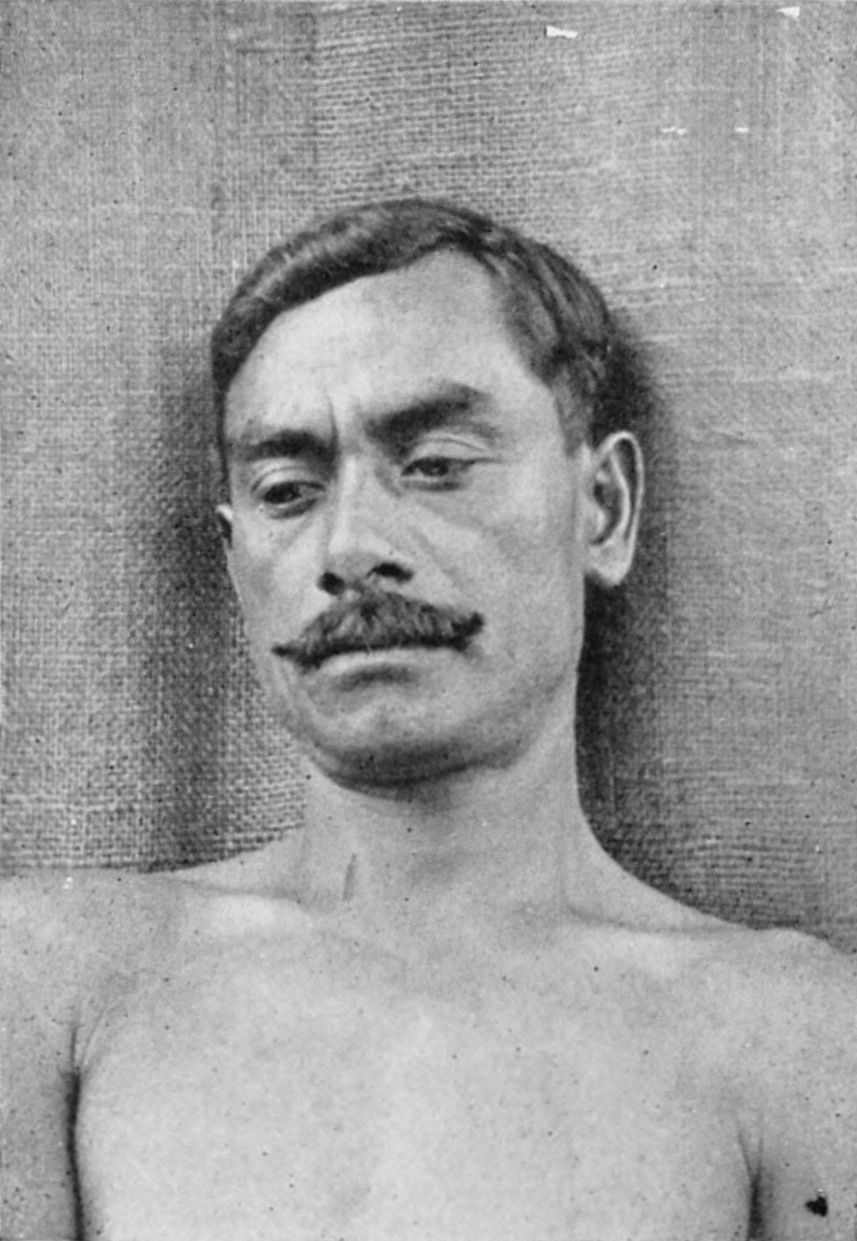
Juan Tepano

During their stay, the German East Asia Squadron, including the armored cruisers Scharnhorst and Gneisenau, and the light cruisers Dresden, Leipzig, Nürnberg, rendezvoused off Hanga Roa. While the expedition covered up their main discoveries to hide them from the Germans, the Germans converted their fleet to a fighting trim. By the time the Germans landed 48 British and French merchant seamen from sunken prizes it had become clear to all that World War I had broken out, and Routledge complained sharply of this infringement of neutral Chilean territory to the schoolmaster in his capacity as representative of the Government of Chile; whilst her husband sailed the Mana to Valparaíso to pass on a similar complaint to the British Consul in Santiago.

There is no record of what steps the schoolmaster took to persuade the German fleet to leave Chilean waters, but they did depart, most of them to Coronel and the Falklands. Some of the stranded French merchant seamen were recruited as labourers by the expedition. Routledge also decided to mediate in the native rebellion against the sheep ranch that was led by local medicine woman and visionary named Angata.

The Routledges departed the island in August, 1915 returning home via Pitcairn and San Francisco. She published her findings in a popular travel book, The Mystery of Easter Island, in 1919. Hundreds of the objects that she and her husband found are now in the Pitt Rivers Museum and the British Museum whilst her paper records are held by the Royal Geographical Society in London. Most of her scientific conclusions are accepted to this day.

== Health ==
During early childhood, Routledge began developing what is today believed to be paranoid schizophrenia. However, she was able to carry out anthropological research (often under arduous conditions involving living in close quarters with others for years) with no sign of the condition. Her brother, Harold Pease, also had mental illness, although whether he also had schizophrenia is unclear. Routledge became involved with Spiritualism during her Oxford years and practised automatic writing.

After 1925, her schizophrenia got worse and displayed itself in the form of delusional paranoia. She threw Scoresby out of her Hyde Park, London mansion and locked herself inside. She also hid many of her field notes. In 1929 Scoresby and her family had her confined to a mental institution.

She died institutionalized in 1935. Her husband gave some of their field notes to the Royal Geographical Society. One of his executors found photographs of the Easter Island expedition ten years after his death. Maps of the expedition were also found in Scoresby's house in Cyprus in 1961. Another, final cache of the papers of Katherine Routledge and her husband William Scoresby Routledge devolved to his residual legatee in England, John Charles Dundas Harington (1903-1980), British judge and barrister. That large archive consisted of diaries, field notes, original illustrations, photographs, and artifacts, among other materials, relating to the expeditions of Katherine Routledge and her husband in Kenya and Polynesia, among other places. The archive was sold and dispersed in a series of auctions between 2017 and 2021; a portion is now owned by The Jack Daulton Collection in California. Family papers and photographs, previously unpublished, including details of her illness, were made public through a biography of her. Archaeology on Easter Island continues to make use of her field notes and ethnographic research.
