= Kerekorio Manu Rangi =

'Ariki mau (King of Easter Island)

‘Ariki mau (King of Easter Island)
- Reign: January 1864 – October 1867
- Predecessor: Tepito
- Successor: None
- Born: c. 1853–1855; Easter Island
- Died: October 1867 (aged 12–14); Easter Island
- Religion: Roman Catholicism

Kerekorio Manu Rangi (c. 1853–1855 – October 1867), also known as Rokoroko He Tau and by his baptismal name Gregorio (Kerekorio), was the last undisputed ‘ariki mau, or King of Easter Island. He died as a child and left no heir, which ended the ‘ariki mau dynasty.

== Biography ==
Manu Rangi was born on Easter Island between c. 1853 and c. 1855, a member of the Rapa Nui people. He was from the royal lineage of the ‘ariki mau (King of Easter Island), which, according to Polynesian belief, "went back to the gods themselves." According to Alfred Metraux, he was the grandson of Ngaꞌara and likely the son of ‘ariki mau Tepito, as well as a cousin of a previous king, Maurata; however, in Steven Roger Fischer's book Island at the End of the World, he listed Manu Rangi as a son of Maurata. His name, Manu Rangi, meant "Heavenly Bird," and he was also known by the name Rokoroko He Tau.

As a young boy, Manu Rangi was the atariki, the heir apparent to the kingship of Easter Island. During his life, the island's population was decimated by slave raids and disease, and in late December 1862, sailors on the Peruvian ship Cora kidnapped several people from Easter Island including Manu Rangi. He was about eight years old at the time. After the ship raided Easter Island, it sailed to Rapa in the Austral Islands to take more "immigrants." Those in Rapa took over the boat and sailed to Tahiti. The Easter Islanders and the Rapans discussed with each other and compared geographical notes, leading to the discovery that Rapa ("Extremity") in the Australs was less remote than Rapa – Easter Island, which led to the Austral island being renamed Rapa ‘Iti ("Lesser Extremity") while Easter Island became Rapa Nui ("Greater Extremity"). Manu Rangi and his fellow islanders were able to return to Easter Island and arrived in January 1864, with him becoming the new ‘ariki mau upon arrival. Manu Rangi, as ‘ariki mau, declared the change of the name to Rapa Nui.

Still a child, Manu Rangi became the ‘ariki mau at a time when the position was increasingly losing authority. He was recognized by islanders as the chief, but he held little political authority. One missionary on the island noted that "One still has for him a certain respect, one still brings him the firstfruits of yams, but he in no way intervenes in island affairs. The power is always usurped by several usurpers each more audacious, more wicked, than the other, who succeed one another each year, tyrannizing the population, aggravating its misery and accelerating its complete dissolution."

Missionary Hippolyte Roussel called Manu Rangi the "little chief" ("le petit chef"). As ‘ariki mau, Manu Rangi was considered tapu (sacred); Roussel noted that "[Those who were ‘ariki mau] were obliged to let their hair grow without ever allowing the mata (cutting stone) to pass through it. I remember well that when I arrived on Easter island the young [Manu Rangi] was introduced to me as being the only real chief; he was also the one who wore the hair long. When for cleanliness sake I asked one of the Mangarevans who was with me to cut his hair, the child opposed it firmly and yielded only through force or fear. The anger was so general that the hairdresser was on the point of being stoned when he achieved his work."

By the time Manu Rangi was about 12, he was noted by missionaries on the island for his "distinguished ... intelligence and his excellent dispositions." Around that time, he became a catechumen in the Catholic Church, and he was later baptized, being one of the first Rapa Nui people to do so. He was given the baptismal name Kerekorio (Grégoire or Gregorio). However, in October 1867, Easter Island was devastated by tuberculosis and Manu Rangi was among the deceased. Aged between 12 and 14 at the time of his death, he left no heir, which ended the ancient dynasty of the ‘ariki mau. His death was reported to be "equally regretted by the missionaries and his subjects."
