= Hotu Matuꞌa =

Legendary first settler of Easter Island

Hotu Matuꞌa was the legendary first settler and ariki mau ("supreme chief" or "king") of Easter Island and ancestor of the Rapa Nui people. Hotu Matuꞌa and his two-canoe (or one double-hulled canoe) colonising party were Polynesians from the now unknown land of Hiva (probably the Marquesas). They landed at Anakena beach and his people spread out across the island, sub-divided it between clans claiming descent from his sons, and lived for more than a thousand years in their isolated island home at the southeastern tip of the Polynesian Triangle.

== History ==
Polynesians first came to Rapa Nui (also called Easter Island) sometime between 300 CE and 800 CE. These are the common elements of oral history that have been extracted from island legends. Linguistic, DNA and pollen analysis all point to a Polynesian first settlement of the island at that time, but it is unlikely that other details can be verified. During this era, the Polynesians were colonising islands across a vast expanse of the Pacific Ocean. Hotu Matuꞌa led his people from Hiva; linguistic analysis comparing Rapanui to other Polynesian languages suggests this was the Marquesas Islands.

== Legend ==
The royal adviser Hau-Maka had a dream in which his spirit traveled to a far country, to help look for new land for King Hotu Matuꞌa. He traveled to the Mata ki te rangi ("Eyes that look to the sky"). The island has also been called Te pito o te henua, which means "the Center of the Earth." Both islands are commonly said to be Easter Island.

When Hau-Maka woke, he told the king. The king then ordered seven men to travel to the island from Hiva, their mythical home, to investigate. They found the land and returned to Hiva. The king himself then traveled to the new island. The king traveled with his queen, Vakai (Vakai-a-hiva).

== Theories and controversy ==
=== Tuꞌu ko Iho ===
The resemblance of the name to an early Mangarevan founder god, Atu Motua ("Father Lord"), has made some historians suspect that Hotu Matuꞌa was added to Easter Island mythology only in the 1860s, along with adopting the Mangarevan language. The real founder would have been Tuꞌu ko Iho, who became just a supporting character in the Hotu Matuꞌa–centric legends.

=== Dates of the first settlements ===
There is considerable uncertainty about the accuracy of this legend as well as the date of settlement. Published literature suggests the island was settled around 300–400 CE, or at about the time of the arrival of the earliest settlers in Hawaii. Some scientists say that Easter Island was not inhabited until 700–800 CE. This date range is based on glottochronological calculations and on three radiocarbon dates from charcoal that appears to have been produced during forest clearance activities, while a recent study, with radiocarbon dates from what is thought to be very early material, proves the island was settled by 1200 CE. This seems to be supported by the latest information on island's deforestation that could have started around the same time. Any earlier human activity seems to be insignificant or low impact.

=== South America or Polynesia ===
The Norwegian ethnographer Thor Heyerdahl pointed out many cultural similarities between Easter Island and South American Indian cultures which he suggested might have resulted from some settlers arriving also from the continent. According to local legends, a group of long-eared unknown men referred to as hanau eepe had arrived on the island sometime after Polynesians, introducing the stone carving technology and attempting to enslave the local Polynesians. Some early accounts of the legend place hanau epe as the original residents and Polynesians as later immigrants coming from Oparo. After mutual suspicions erupted in a violent clash, the hanau eepe were overthrown and exterminated, leaving only one survivor. The first description of island's demographics by Jacob Roggeveen in 1722 still claimed that the population consisted of two distinctive ethnic groups, one being clearly Polynesian and the other "white" with so lengthened earlobes that they could tie them behind their necks. Roggeveen also noted how some of the islanders were "generally large in stature". Islanders' tallness was also witnessed by the Spanish who visited the island in 1770, measuring heights of 196 and 199 cm (6.4 and 6.5 ft).

The fact that sweet potatoes, a staple of the Polynesian diet, and several other domestic plants – up to 12 in Easter Island – are of South American origin indicates that there may have been some contact between the two cultures. Either Polynesians have traveled to South America and back, or South American balsa rafts have drifted to Polynesia, possibly unable to make a return trip because of their less developed navigational skills and more fragile boats, or both. Polynesian connections in South America have been noticed among the Mapuche Indians in central and southern Chile. The Polynesian name for the small islet of Salas y Gómez (Manu Motu Motiro Hiva, "Bird's islet on the way to a far away land"), east of Easter Island, has also been seen as a hint that South America was known before European contacts. Further complicating the situation is that the word Hiva ("far away land") was also the name of the islanders' legendary home country. Inexplicable insistence on an eastern origin for the first inhabitants was unanimous among the islanders in all early accounts.

Mainstream archeology is skeptical about any non-Polynesian influence on the island's prehistory, although the discussion has become political. DNA sequence analysis of Easter Island's current inhabitants (a tool not available in Heyerdahl's time) offers strong evidence of Polynesian origins. In 2017, analysis of human remains from Rapanui pre-dating European contact found evidence of only Polynesian ancestry. A 2020 study of DNA from across Polynesia found conclusive evidence of contact with South America, which likely occurred in Eastern Polynesia before the settlement of Rapanui.

== See also ==
- Chiefs of Easter Island – more information on the arrival of the Paramount Chief and his people
- Rapa Nui mythology
- Rapa Nui
- Easter Island History
- Rapa Nui people
