= Hippolyte Roussel =

French priest and missionary to Polynesia

Hippolyte Roussel (22 March 1824 in La Ferté-Macé – 22 January 1898 in Gambier Islands) was a French priest and missionary to Polynesia, a member of the Congregation of the Sacred Hearts of Jesus and Mary.

== Life ==
He was ordained as a priest in 1849. In 1854 he was sent to evangelize in Oceania, arriving in Tahiti in July 1854, and Marquesas on October 8, before being sent to the Tuamotus, and Mangareva in the Gambier Islands. He was removed from his post in Mangareva because of his "strident pronouncements", and in 1866 was appointed to lead a new mission to Easter Island (Rapa Nui), with Eugène Eyraud. The pair initially received a bad response from the islanders, however by October 1968 they had baptised 380 people. Eyraud however died shortly thereafter of tuberculosis.

During his stay on Easter Island, he compiled notes on the customs and traditions of the islanders, which he sent to Valparaíso in 1869 and which were published in April and June 1926 in the Annals of the Sacred Hearts of Picpus.

In 1871, after conflict with the manager of the Brander plantation, Jean-Baptiste Dutrou-Bornier, who then began to persecute those faithful to the mission, he was forced to leave Easter Island on the orders of Bishop Florentin-Étienne Jaussen, and took 168 islanders with him, leaving only 230 Rapanui on the island. He went to Rikitea on Mangareva with the 168 Rapanui, and led the mission there until his death on 25 January 1898. He periodically returned to Easter Island including in 1882-83 to appoint Atamu Tekena as the island's king.
