= Policarpo Toro =

Chilean naval officer (1851–1921)

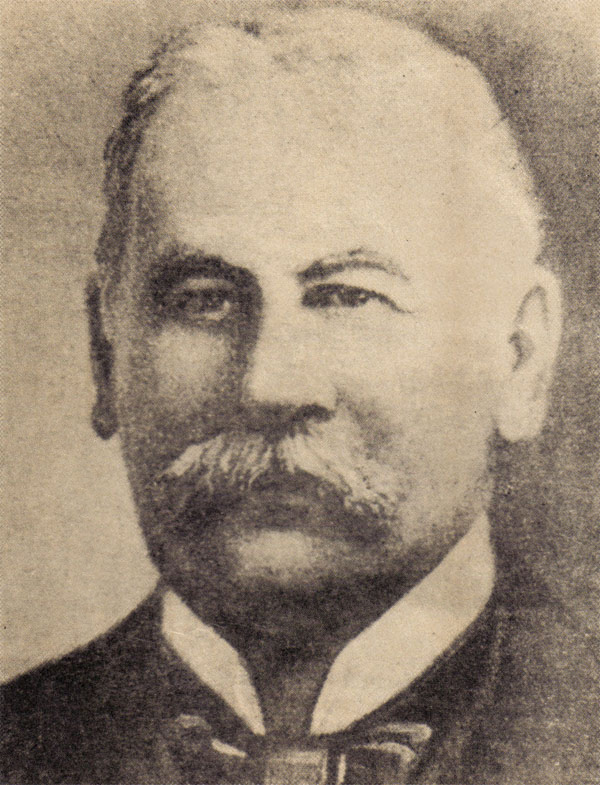
- Born: February 6, 1856; Melipilla, Chile
- Died: 1921 (aged 65); Santiago, Chile
- Military career
- Allegiance: Chile
- Branch: Navy
- Service years: 1871–1891
- Conflicts: War of the Pacific: Battle of Angamos; Battle of Pisagua; Battle of Arica

Policarpo Toro Hurtado (born in Melipilla, Chile on February 6, 1856 – died 1921 in Santiago, Chile) was a Chilean naval officer.

He enlisted in the Chilean Navy in 1871 and visited Easter Island in 1875. From 1877 to 1879, he joined the English Navy as a second lieutenant. In 1879, as the War of the Pacific started, he asked to return to Chile and participated in several actions. In 1883, he visited Easter Island a second time and elaborated in a document the economic advantages to Chile in acquiring the island.

With government approval, he visited the island in 1887. After a year of negotiations with the islanders under Atamu Tekena, on September 9, 1888, he took possession of the island on behalf of Chile. In 1891, he refused to participate in naval actions against José Manuel Balmaceda's government in the 1891 Chilean Civil War and was separated from the navy. In 1893, in the general amnesty enacted by the new government, he was pensioned. He died in Santiago in 1921.

== Early life ==
Policarpo Toro was born on February 6, 1856, in the city of Melipilla, Chile. He was the son of farm owners. At a young age, he developed an interest in the sea and naval affairs. His passion for the navy led him to join the State Naval School, now known as the Arturo Prat Naval School, on February 17, 1871, where he began his naval career as a cadet.

== Naval career ==
In 1873, Toro participated in an expedition to the Strait of Magellan to raise the plan of the city of Punta Arenas. Two years later, he traveled aboard the O'Higgins corvette to Easter Island, where he participated in a scientific expedition to carry out reconnaissance and cartography of the island. Toro was deeply affected by the terrible living conditions of the islanders, who were suffering from the mistreatment of other expeditions searching for slaves and wealth.

Upon returning to the continent, Toro sought the support of prominent personalities to annex the insular territory to Chile. In 1876, he traveled to England aboard the armored frigate Cochrane, where he participated in various activities of the British Royal Navy. After returning to Chile, he was promoted to 1st Lieutenant and awarded the position of Second Commander of the Magallanes Gunship due to his important work during the War of the Pacific.

Toro was appointed professor at the Naval School in 1883, promoted to Lieutenant Commander, and held administrative positions in the Chilean Navy three years later. In 1886, he returned to Easter Island on board the corvette Abtao, where he observed that the living conditions of the islanders had worsened. This prompted him to address a memoir to President José Manuel Balmaceda in order to convince him of the usefulness of taking possession of the island.

After receiving approval and authorization from President Balmaceda, Toro initiated negotiations with the French, Tahiti, and the inhabitants of Easter Island to ensure that no other nation claimed the island. In 1888, Toro took official possession of the island on behalf of the State of Chile, culminating in a negotiation with the King of Atamu Tekena Island by signing an act of cession in Spanish and another in Rapanui mixed with Tahitian.

Toro was appointed Director of the Escuela de Grumentes, where he applied all the knowledge he had acquired during his time in Great Britain. However, during the Chilean civil war in 1891, Toro remained loyal to President Balmaceda, leading to his arrest and subsequent release from the army. He was assigned a retirement worthy of his rank and past efforts by President Jorge Montt in 1893.

Policarpo Toro died in 1921, at the age of 65, in Santiago. He is remembered as the man who integrated Easter Island into the State of Chile, a significant achievement that helped to preserve the cultural and natural heritage of the island.

== Sources ==
- https://web.archive.org/web/20080211103355/http://www.armada.cl/site/tradicion_historia/historia/biografias/235ptoro.htm
- http://www.icarito.cl//medio/articulo/0,0,38035857_172985981_182488343_1,00.html
- https://web.archive.org/web/20080228212905/http://www.ligamar.cl/revis5/69.htm
