= Jean-Baptiste Dutrou-Bornier =

French mariner, settler of Easter Island (1834–1876)

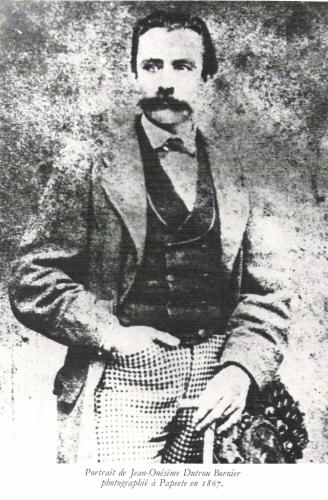
Jean-Baptiste Dutrou-Bornier, from a photograph taken in 1867 in Papeete.

A recreation of Dutrou-Bornier's flag

Jean-Baptiste Onésime Dutrou-Bornier (19 November 1834 – 6 August 1876) was a French mariner who settled on Easter Island in 1868, purchased much of the island, removed many of the Rapa Nui people, and turned the island into a sheep ranch.

== Early life ==
Dutrou-Bornier served as an artillery officer in the Crimean War, and by 1860, had become a master mariner. He abandoned his wife and young son in France, and in 1865, bought a one-third share in the schooner Tampico. He sailed to Peru, where he was arrested, accused of arms-dealing, and sentenced to death. Released on the intervention of the French consul, he sailed to Tahiti, where he began recruiting labour from the islands of East Polynesia for coconut plantations.

== Arrival on Easter Island ==
In November 1866, Dutrou-Bornier transported two missionaries, Kaspar Zumbohm and Theodore Escolan, to Easter Island. He visited the island again in March 1867 to recruit labourers, but then amassed huge gambling debts and, as a result of some fraudulent deals, forfeited his share of the Tampico. He acquired the yacht Aora'i and arrived on Easter Island in April 1868, where the yacht was burnt.

He set up residence at Mataveri and began buying up land from the Rapanui. In 1869, he seized Pua ‘Aku Renga, Koreto, the wife of a Rapanui, and married her. He tried to persuade France to make the island a protectorate and recruited a faction of Rapanui, whom he allowed to abandon their Christianity and revert to their previous faith. With rifles, a cannon, and hut burning, he and his supporters ran the island for several years as "governor", appointing Koreto Queen. The title had no legitimacy behind it and is not recognized by the Rapanui or modern historians.

Dutrou-Bornier aimed to cleanse the island of most of the Rapanui and turn it into a sheep ranch. He bought up all of the island, apart from the missionaries' area around Hanga Roa, and moved a few hundred Rapanui to Tahiti to work for his backers. In 1871, the missionaries, having fallen out with Dutrou-Bornier, evacuated all but 171 Rapanui to the Gambier islands. Those who remained were mostly older men. Six years later, there were just 111 people living on Easter Island, and only 36 of them had any offspring.

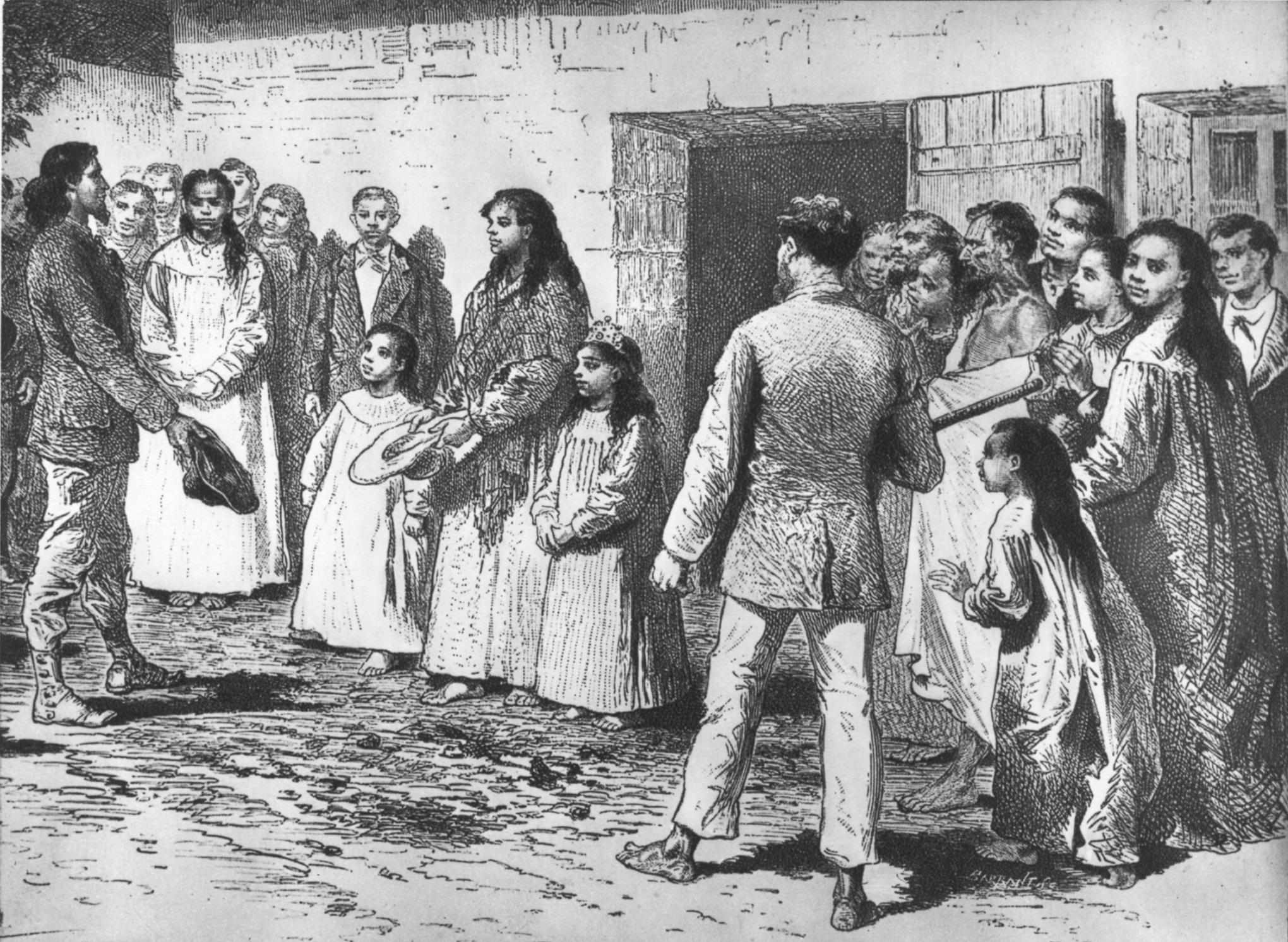
"Queen Mother" Koreto with her daughters, "Queen" Caroline and Harriethe-Marthe, in 1877

== Death ==
In 1876, Dutrou-Bornier was killed in an argument over a dress, though his kidnapping of pubescent girls may also have motivated his killers.

== Legacy ==
Following Dutrou-Bornier's death and into the present day, the island's population slowly recovered. But with over 97% of the population dead or having left in less than a decade, much of the island's cultural knowledge had been lost.

Neither his first wife back in France, who was heir under French law, nor his second wife on the island, who briefly installed their daughter Caroline as Queen, were to keep much from his estate. But to this day, most of the island is a ranch controlled from off-island, and for more than a century, real power on the island was usually exercised by resident non-Rapanui living at Mataveri. An unusual number of shipwrecks had left the island better supplied with wood than for many generations, whilst legal wrangles over Dutrou-Bornier's land deals were to complicate the island's history for decades to come.
