= Steven Roger Fischer =

Linguist from New Zealand (born 1947)

Steven Roger Fischer (born 1947) is a linguist who studies Polynesian languages from the Royal Society of New Zealand.

== Sources ==
- "Steven Roger Fischer". University of Chicago Press.
- "A History of the Pacific Islands (2nd Edition)". Macmillan Education.
- Steven Roger Fischer (1997). "Glyph-Breaker". Copernicus.
