= Holy Cross Church, Hanga Roa =

Holy Cross Church
- Iglesia de la Santa Cruz
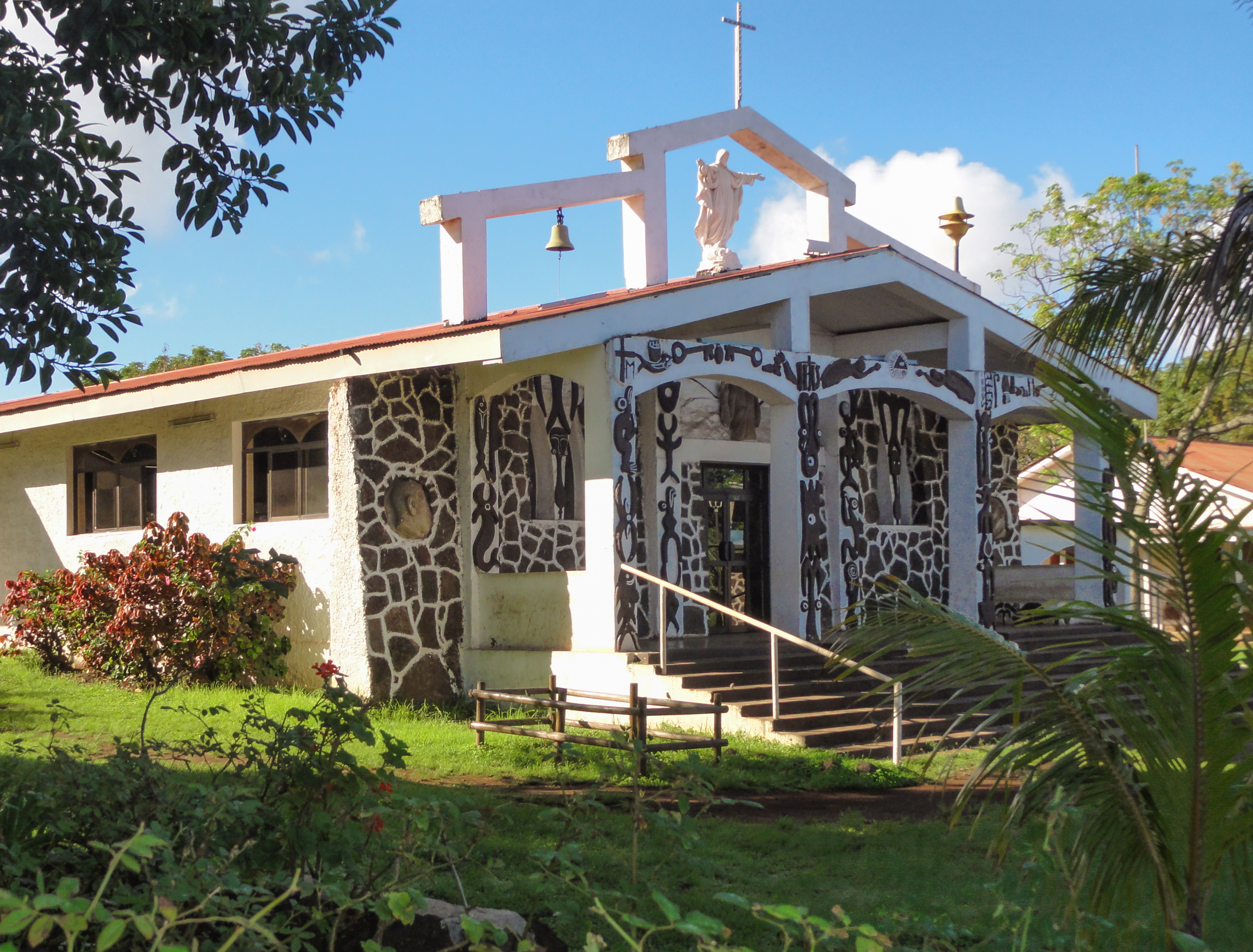
- Holy Cross Church
- 27.1483°S 109.424065°W
- Location: Hanga Roa
- Country: Chile
- Denomination: Catholic Church
- Tradition: Latin Rite

History
- Dedication: Holy Cross

The Holy Cross Church (Spanish: Iglesia de la Santa Cruz), also known as the Catholic Church of Hanga Roa, or simply the Hanga Roa Church is a Catholic Church in Te Pito Te Henua Street in the city of Hanga Roa, the capital and greater city of the Easter Island, a Territory of Chile in the Pacific Ocean. The church was established in 1937, its first priest being Father Sebástian Englert.

The interior of the Holy Cross Church includes locally-carved representations of Jesus Christ, the Virgin Mary and Christian saints. The building is notable for its external decoration: its façade combines Christian religious motifs with native elements. The church is set in surrounding gardens.

Masses are said in Spanish; hymns are sung in the Rapa Nui language. The church's religious services are attended by both local Catholics and tourists attracted by the architecture of the site.

== History ==
The Holy Cross Parish was established in December 1937 and belongs to the Diocese of Valparaíso. The church was founded thanks to the efforts of missionary Sebastian Englert.

== Architecture and Furnishings ==
The church building is an example of syncretism – a combination of Catholic motifs with local traditions. This is evident even on the facade, where a horizontal band features Christian symbols, such as the Ten Commandments tablets, keys to heaven, and angels, while the columns display island symbols: figures of Tangata manu, fish, and the manutara bird.

The interior of the church is simple. Inside, near the entrance, there are sculptures depicting Archangel Michael and St. Francis of Assisi.

The upper part of the baptismal font is decorated with symbols of rongorongo. On the left side of the church, there is a sculpture of the Sacred Heart, with Jesus’ face resembling a moai kavakava and a reimiro (a traditional crescent-shaped ornament) on his chest. Nearby, there is a tabernacle sculpted from a tree trunk, decorated with plant motifs. The cross above the main altar is made of volcanic stone, while the figure of Christ wears a headdress made of shells and bones.

To the right of the main altar is the sculpture of the Our Lady of Rapa Nui. The figure, created in 1970, is considered the first Christian image made on Easter Island by local artisans. Mary's figure is styled like a moai, with a crown made of shells topped by the silhouette of a manutara. Her eyes are made of shells with pupils of obsidian.

The church also contains sculptures of St. Rose of Lima, the Holy Family, and the Holy Spirit. The sculptures in the temple are made of wood and represent an attempt to integrate local tradition with Christianity.

Liturgy in the church is conducted in Spanish, but hymns are sung in Rapanui.

== Burials ==
- Angata
- Eugène Eyraud
- Nicolás Pakarati
- Sebastian Englert

== See also ==
- Catholic Church in Chile

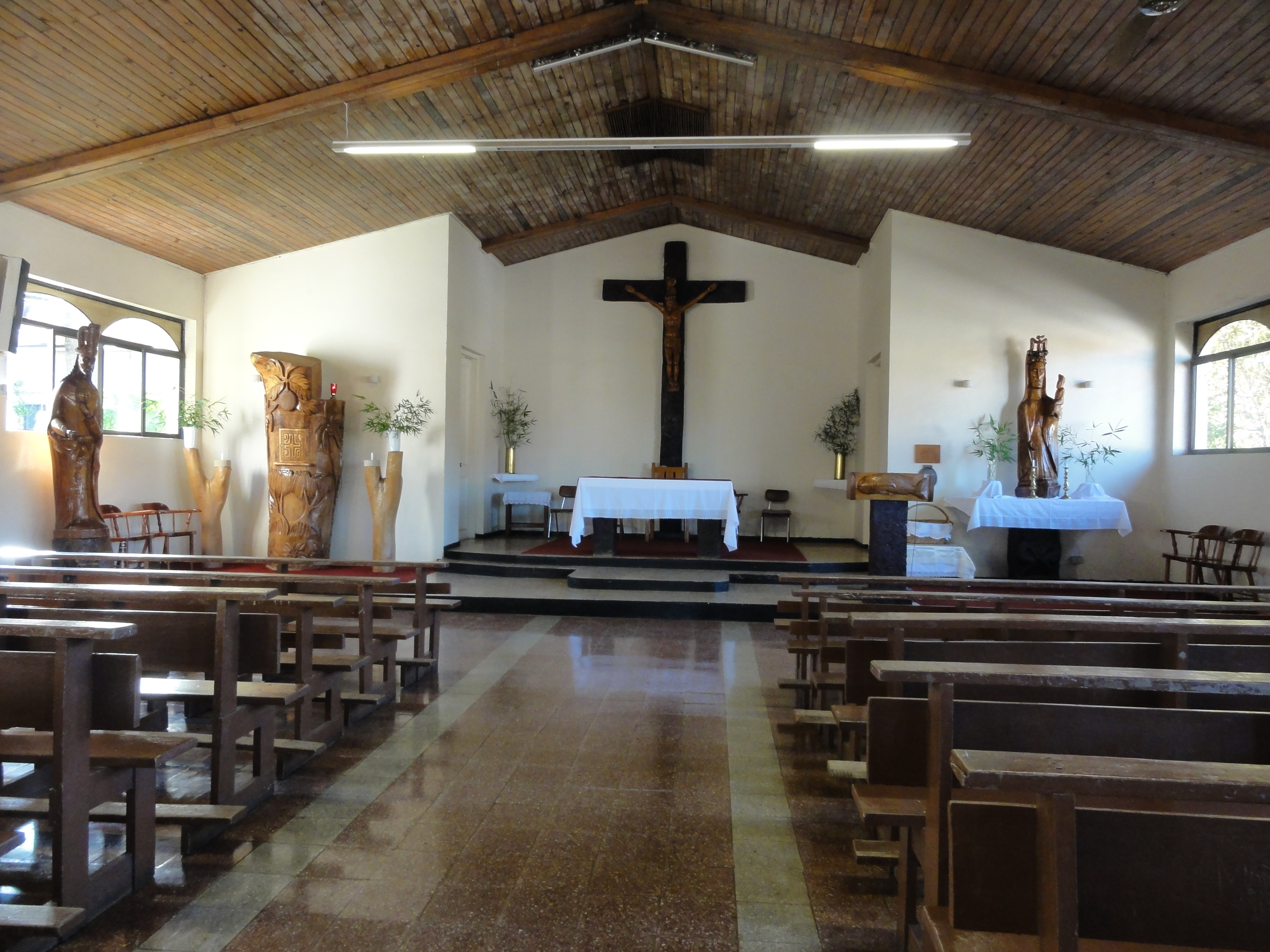
Internal View
