= Eugène Eyraud =

French-born Easter Island lay friar

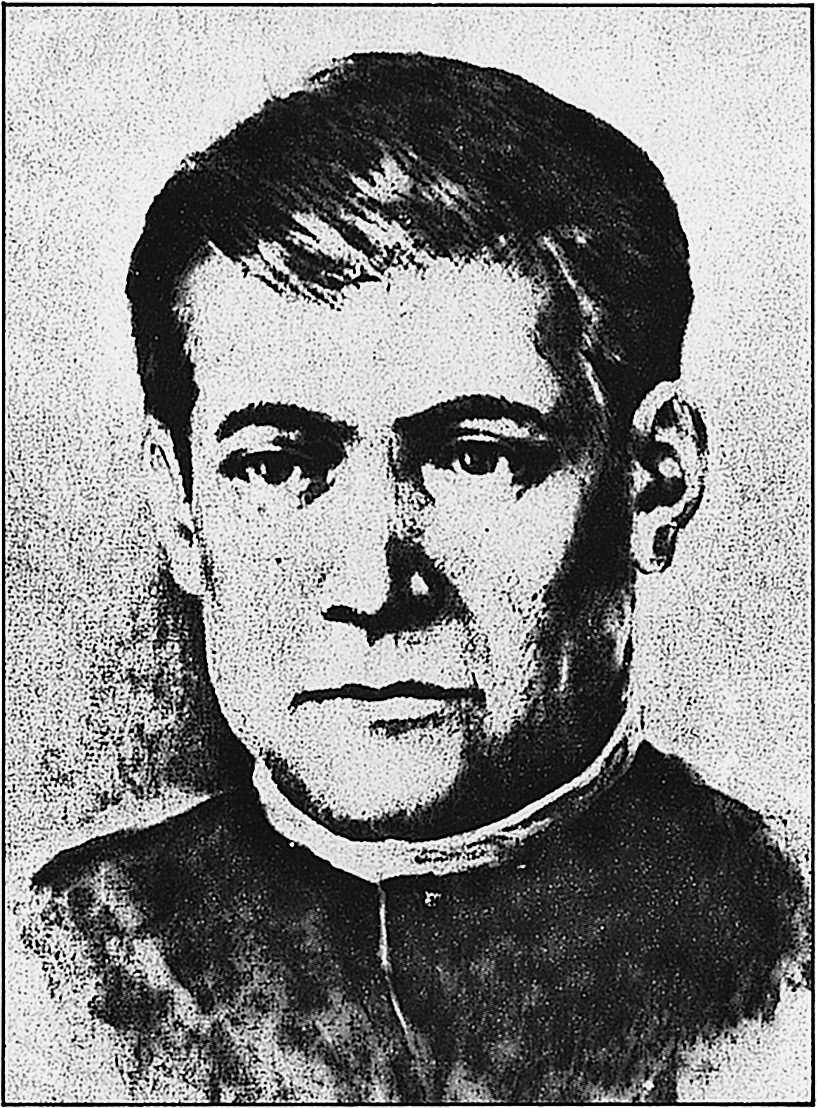
Eugène Eyraud

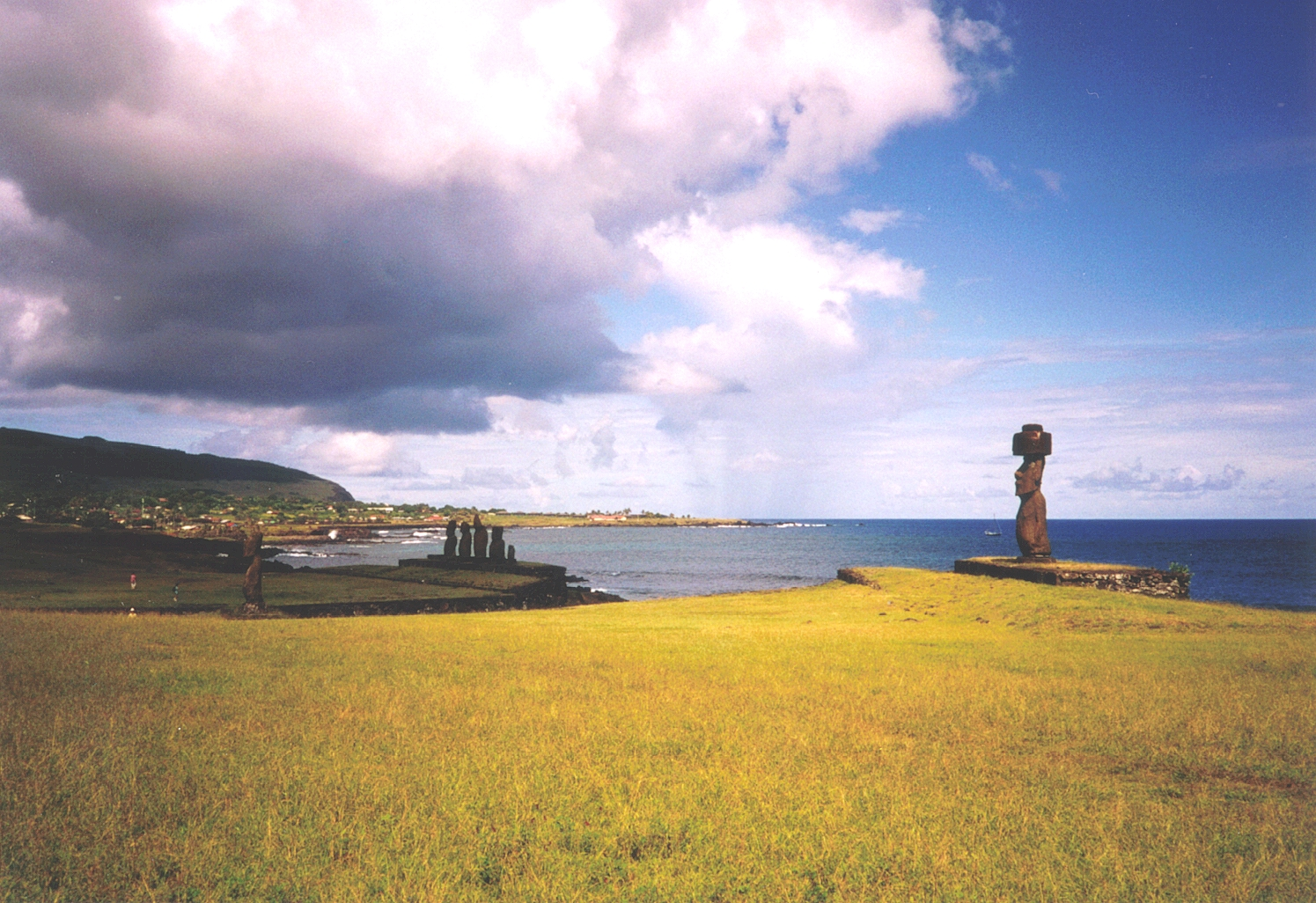
Hanga Roa

Eugène Eyraud (1820 – 23 August 1868) was a lay friar of the Congregation of the Sacred Hearts of Jesus and Mary and the first Westerner to live on Easter Island.

== Early life ==
Eyraud was born in Saint-Bonnet-en-Champsaur, France, in 1820. He became a mechanic by profession.

He went to Bolivia, and acquired mining interests there.

== Arrival on Easter Island ==
Eyraud entered the Picpus Fathers as a novice. Influenced by his brother Jean, a missionary in China, he left Chile for Tahiti in 1862 and arrived at Hanga Roa on 2 January 1864. He was harassed by the islanders, and only stayed nine months before being repatriated to Chile on 11 October 1864. A year and a half later, on 27 March 1866, he settled on the island, accompanied by Père Hippolyte Roussel Ss.Cc. and three Mangarevan converts.

== Activities ==
Although fiercely opposed at first, Eyraud eventually came to be highly popular and influential among the islanders. In October 1866, Gaspar Zumbohm and Théodule Escolan joined Eyraud and Roussel in their mission, and set up schools at Hanga Roa and Vaihū.

On 22 December 1866 Eyraud wrote

The chances of triumph show themselves day by day to be ever more certain, and the hour of Providence seems to have arrived for the inhabitants of Easter Island. The mission was established the moment the work of destruction touched its final limits: destruction in the material order, destruction in the moral order.

He assisted that year in what would be the last ceremony of the Birdman cult.

Tuberculosis came to the island in 1867, which led to the death of a quarter of the island's population, and Eyraud died of it on 23 August 1868, nine days after the last islanders had been baptized.

He was buried at the Holy Cross Church, Hanga Roa.

== Rongorongo ==
During his first stay, Eyraud remarked that in each house there were wooden tablets covered with "hieroglyphs", now known as rongorongo, but that the islanders no longer knew how to read them and paid them scant attention. He didn't think of informing Roussel or Zumbohm, and never wrote of them again. In wasn't until 1869, when Zumbohm presented a gift which, unknown to him included a tablet, to Bishop Jaussen in Tahiti, that rongorongo was noticed by the outside world.

== Traditional beliefs ==
Eyraud wrote of the islanders and their carved wooden statues, known as mo‘ai kavakava

Although I always lived with them in the greatest familiarity, I have not been able to find any positive act of religious worship. In all the houses, you can see many statuettes about thirty centimeters in height representing men, fish, birds, etc. […] These are undoubtedly idols, but I never found them given any kind of honour. I saw, on the occasion the natives take these statues outside, them making a few gestures and accompanying all this with a kind of meaningless dance and chant.

== Bibliography ==
- Orliac, Catherine; Orliac, Michel. L'île de Pâques : Des dieux regardent les étoiles, collection "Découvertes Gallimard" (nº 38), série Histoire. Gallimard, 2004. ISBN 2-07-053063-9 (new edition; originally published in 1988 under the title Des dieux regardent les étoiles : Les derniers secrets de l'Île de Pâques, translated into English in 1995 as Easter Island: Mystery of the Stone Giants [U.S.] and The Silent Gods: Mysteries of Easter Island [UK]).
- E. Eyraud, « Lettres au T.R.P, Congrégation du sacré-cœur de Jésus et de Marie », Annales Association de la propagation de la foi, vol.38, Lyon 1866 : 52-61 et 124-138.
