= Mataveri International Airport =

Airport on Easter Island

Mataveri International Airport Isla de Pascua Airport
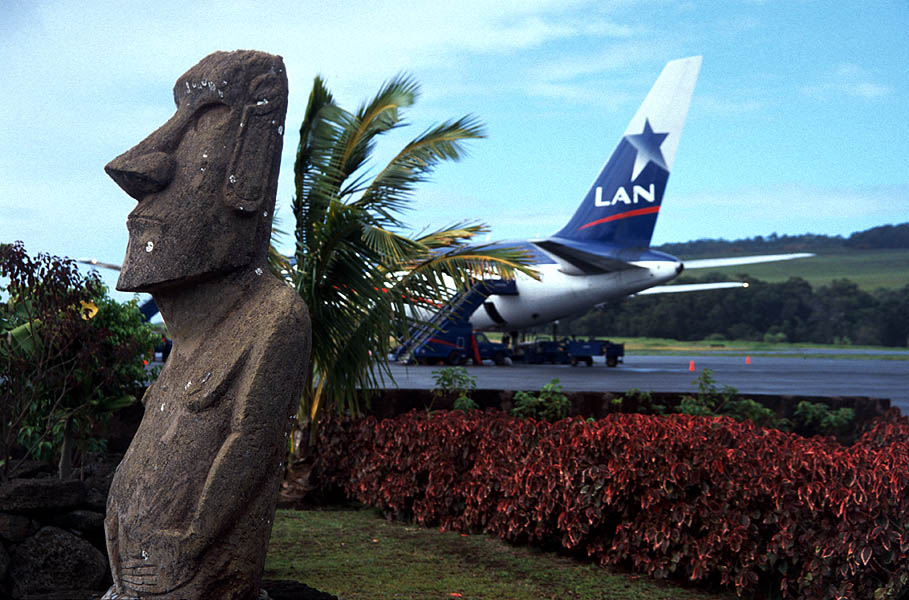
- A LAN Chile aircraft at Mataveri in 2001
- IATA: IPC; ICAO: SCIP; WMO: 85469

Summary
- Airport type: Public/Military
- Operator: Chilean Air Force
- Location: Hanga Roa, Easter Island
- Elevation AMSL: 227 ft (69 m)
- Coordinates: 27°09′53″S 109°25′18″W

Map
- Location of airport in the Pacific Ocean

Runways
Direction	Length		Surface
Direction	m	ft	Surface
10/28	3,305	10,843	Asphalt
- Sources: GCM, SkyVector, Google Maps

Mataveri International Airport or Isla de Pascua Airport (IATA: IPC, ICAO: SCIP) is an airport in Hanga Roa, on Easter Island (Spanish: Isla de Pascua) in Chile. It is the most remote airport in the world, defined by distance to another airport, it is located approximately 2,602 kilometres (1,617 mi; 1,405 nmi) east of Totegegie Airport in French Polynesia. It has scheduled flights to Arturo Merino Benítez International Airport in Santiago operated by Chilean carrier LATAM Chile. The runway starts just inland from the island's southeast coast at Mataveri, and nearly reaches the west coast, almost separating the mountain of Rano Kau from the rest of the island. The airport is the main point of entry for visitors to Easter Island.

== History ==
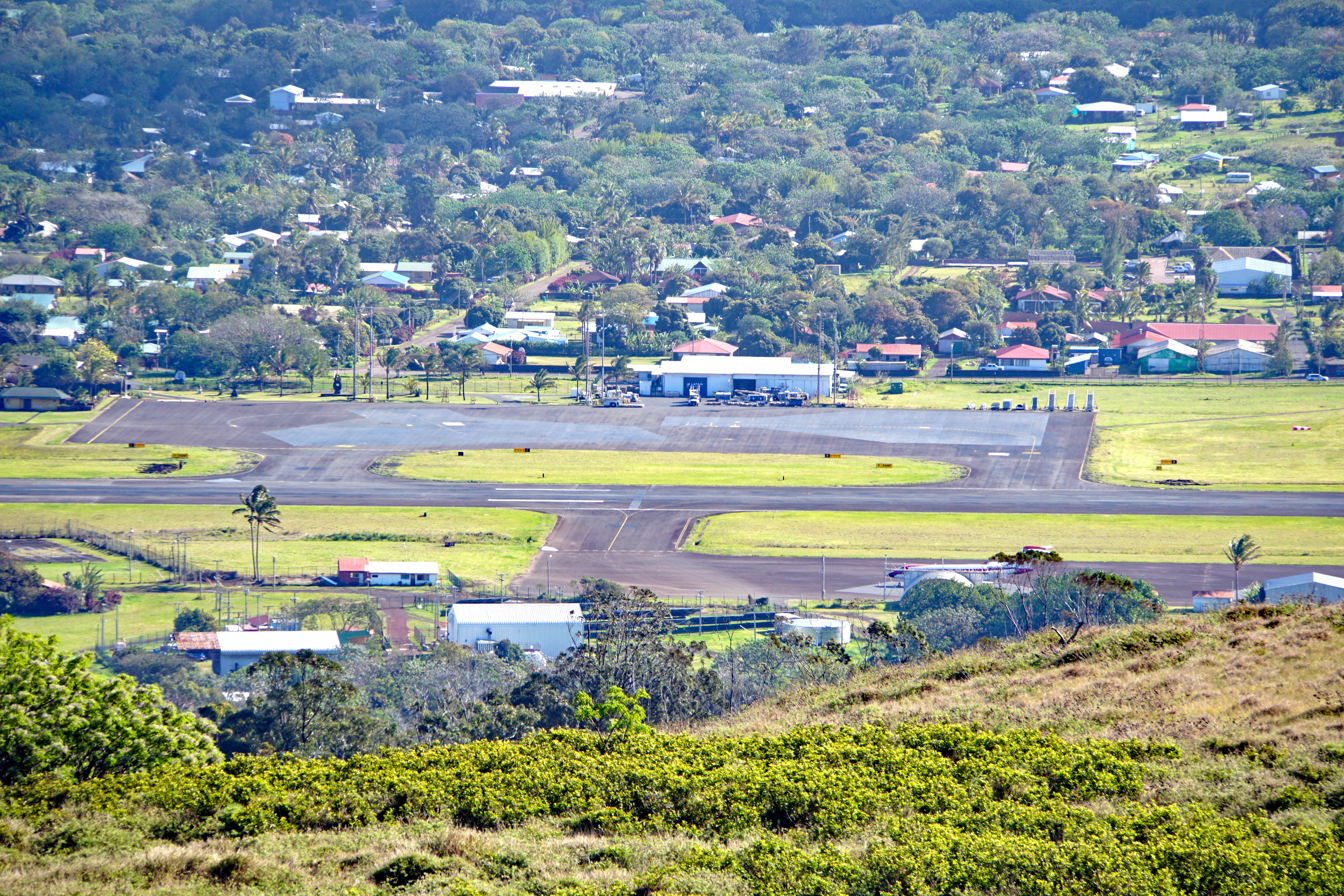
Aerial view in 2019

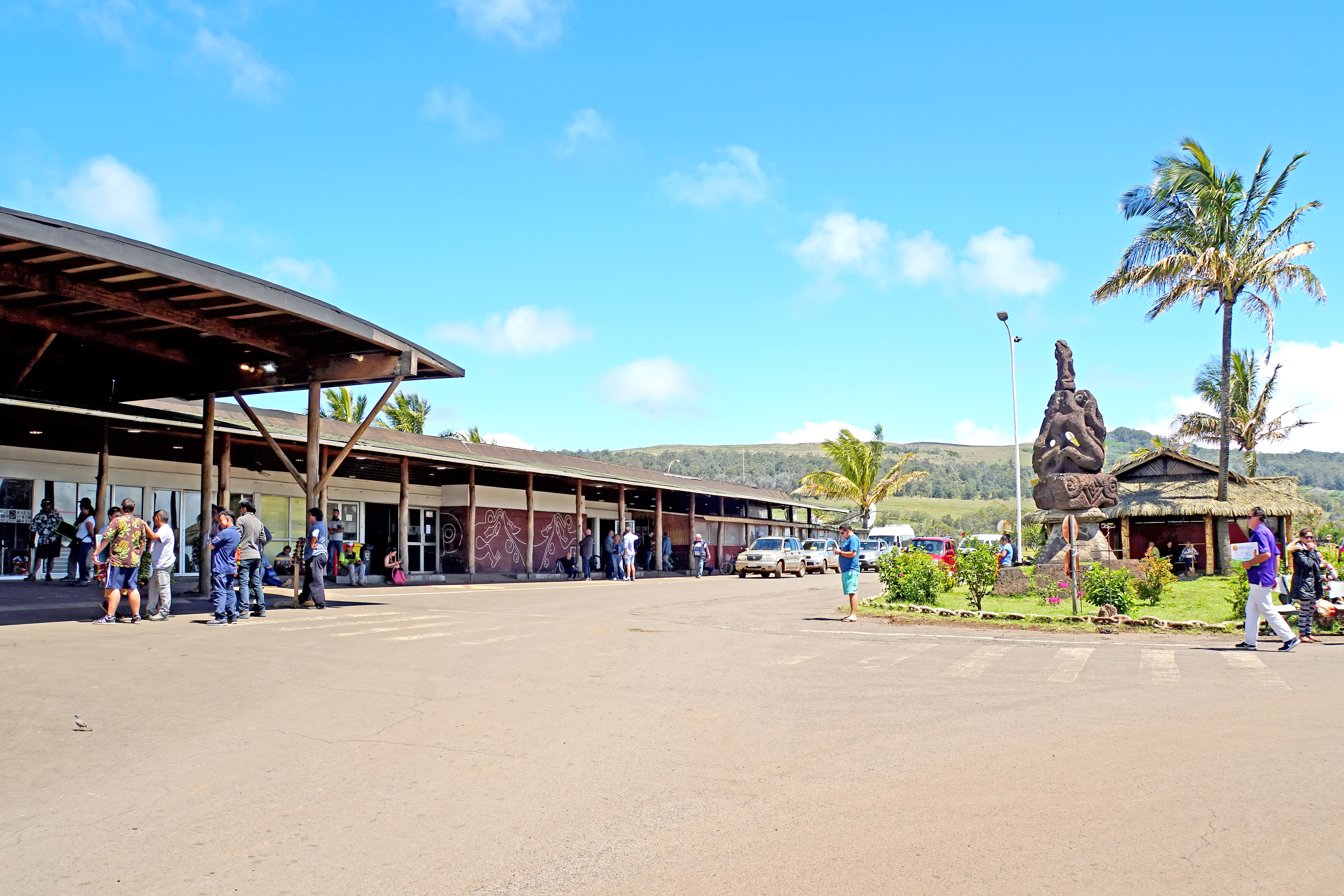
Airport terminal in 2019

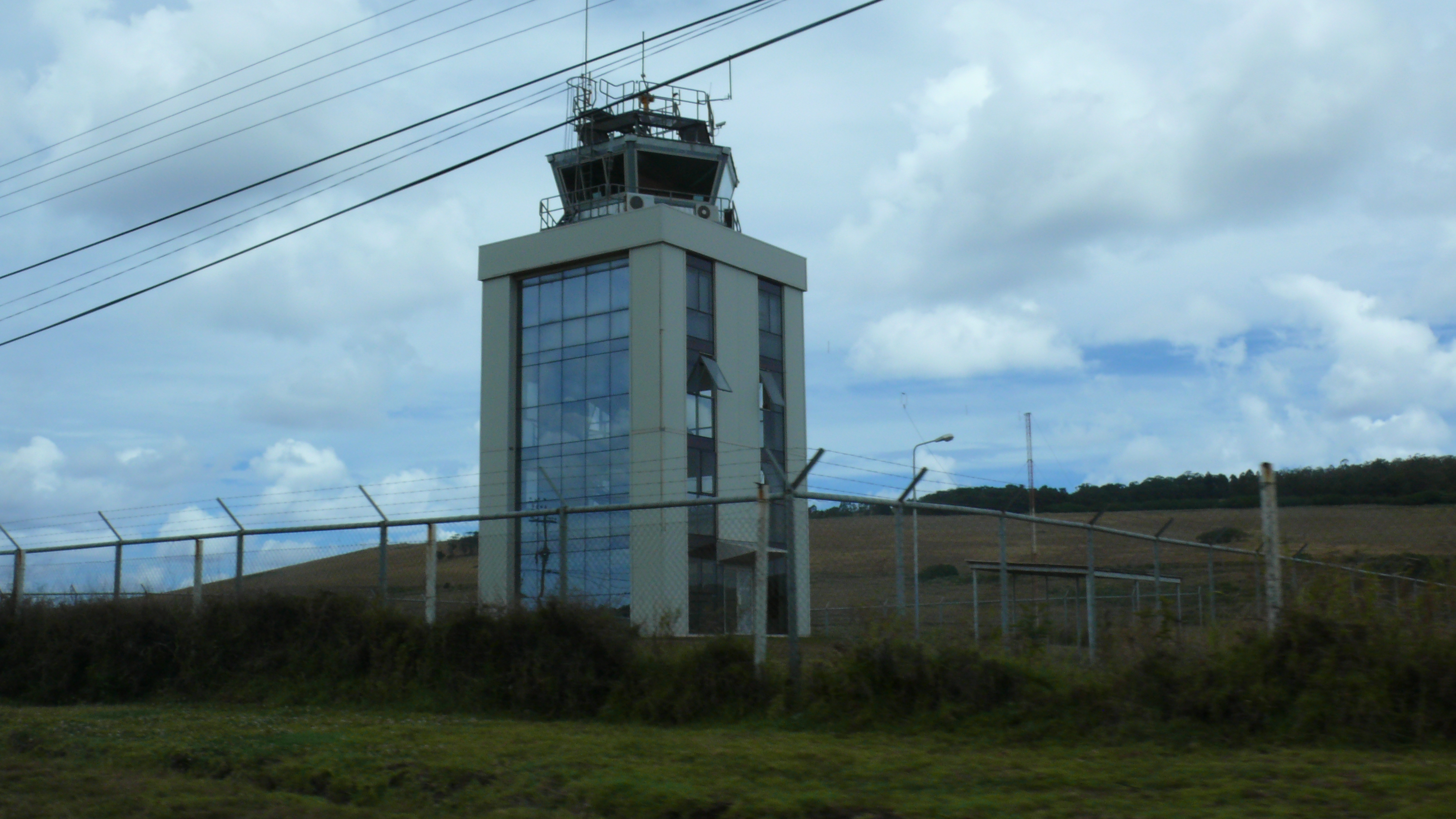
Air traffic control tower

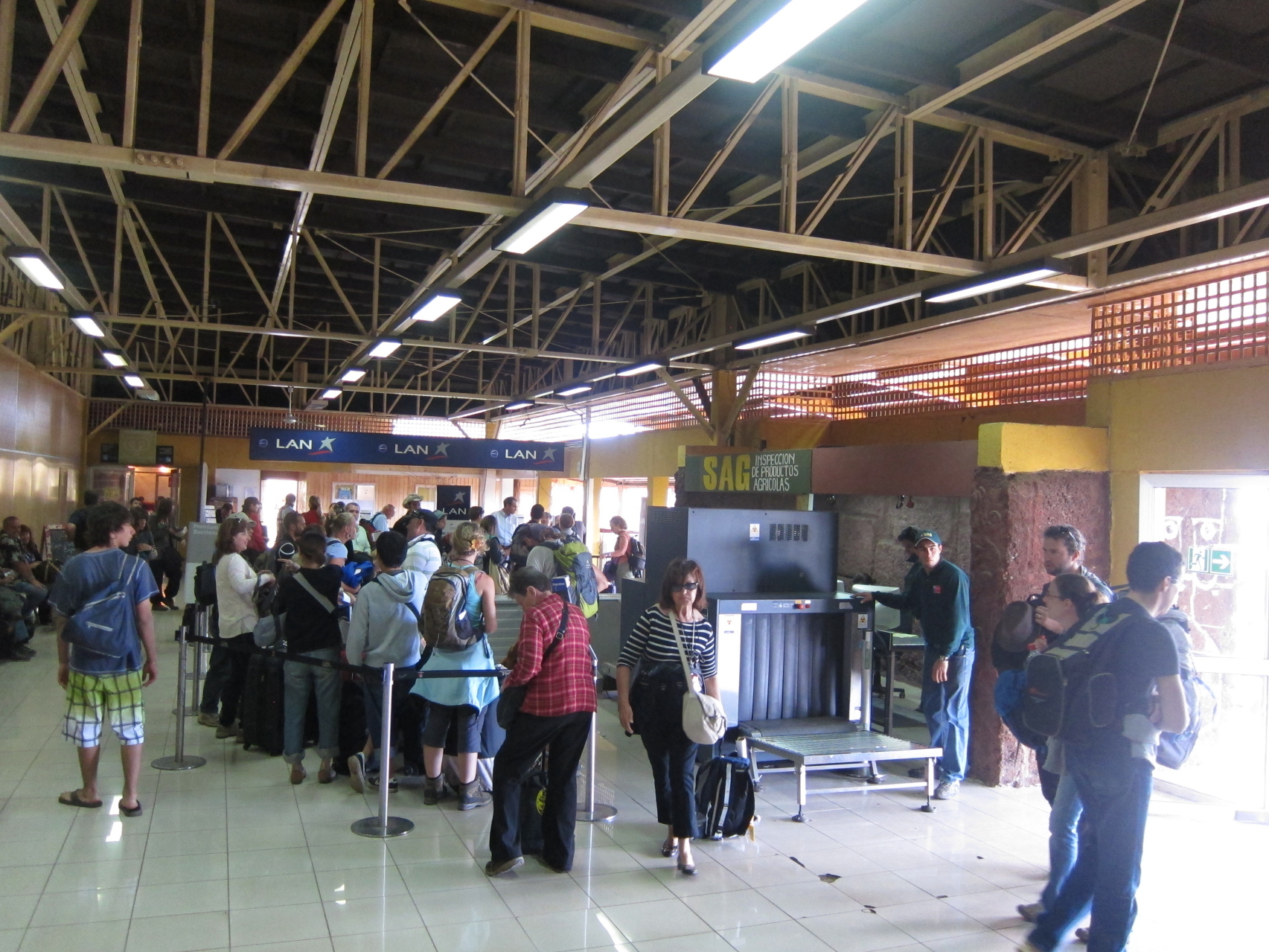
Terminal interior

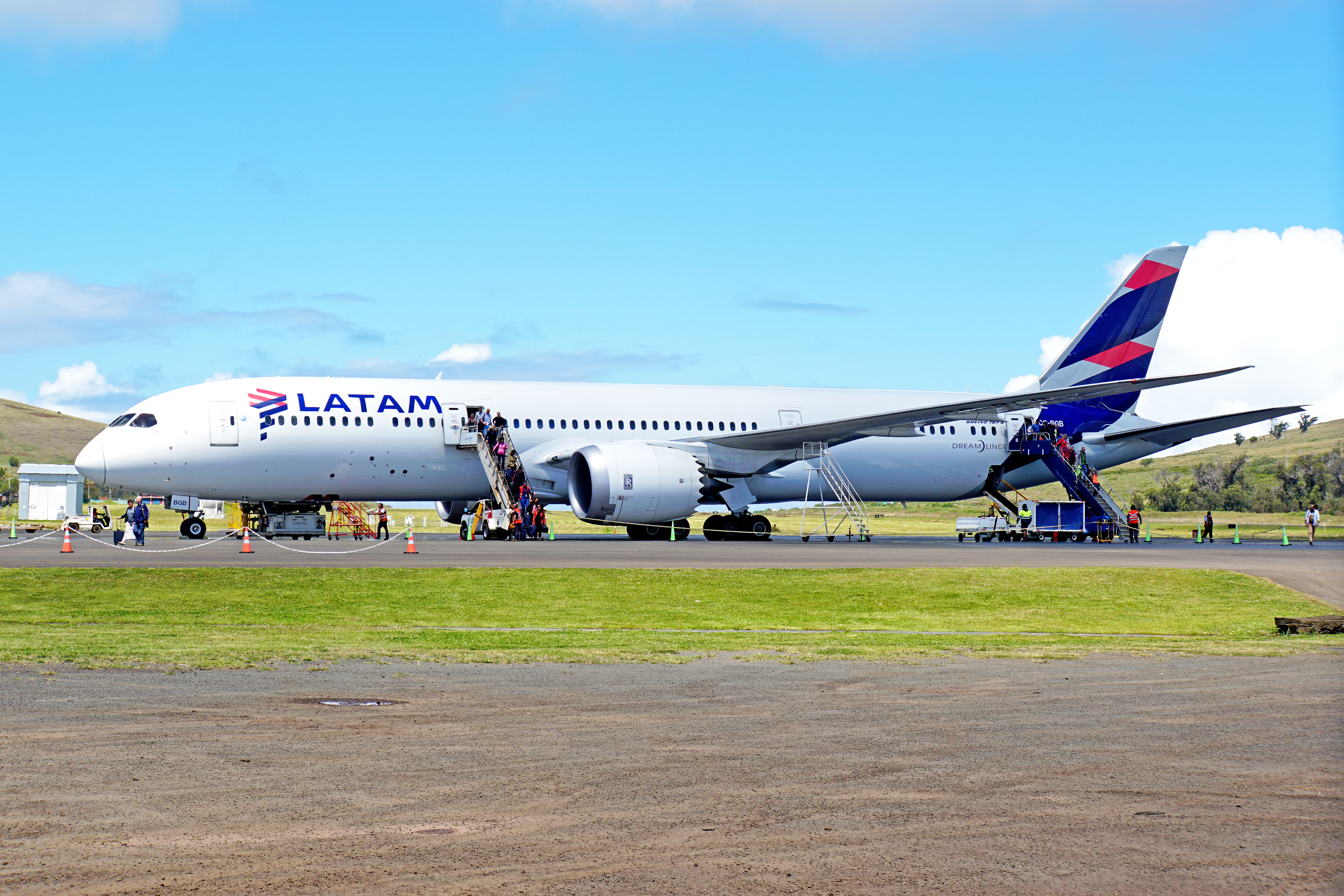
A LATAM Chile Boeing 787-9 on the apron

Scheduled services from the Chilean mainland started in 1967 with a monthly Douglas DC-6B propliner flight operated by LAN-Chile that took nine hours, using a runway extended and paved for use as a U.S. base. In 1970, services were upgraded with weekly Boeing 707-320 nonstop jet service to Santiago, Chile and Faa'a International Airport (PPT) in Papeete, Tahiti. Nonstop service to Papeete had been added earlier during the late 1960s using a DC-6B and the frequency then doubled to twice-weekly with LAN-Chile providing direct connecting 707 service once a week between Easter Island and Frankfurt, Paris and Madrid in Europe via its Santiago hub. By 1975, LAN-Chile had extended its Tahiti route flown once a week with a 707 to Nadi, Fiji (NAN). LAN-Chile then replaced its Boeing 707 flights with Boeing 767-200ER jet service and in 1993 was operating twice weekly round trip flights on the Santiago (SCL) – Easter Island (IPC) – Papeete (PPT) route. The airline later operated Airbus A340 and Boeing 767-300ER wide-bodied jetliners into the airport. The airport has a transit lounge that was used by passengers continuing to or returning from Papeete, Tahiti, which was served by LATAM until June 2020.

The airport's single runway is 3,318 m (10,885 ft) long. The airport was once designated as an abort site for the U.S. Space Shuttle when polar orbital flights from Vandenberg Air Force Base in southern California were planned with this space launch activity then subsequently being cancelled. The project undertaken by NASA to lengthen the runway was completed in 1987 and enabled wide-bodied jets to use the airport, which further boosted tourism to the island.

== Restrictions ==
Due to the lack of diversion airports between Tahiti and South America except for Mataveri, Chilean aviation authorities prohibit more than one aircraft from being in the vicinity of Mataveri. Once an aircraft flying from South America passes the halfway point between South America and Easter Island, no other aircraft can be closer than its own halfway point until the first aircraft successfully lands on the island. This is because if an aircraft should have an accident that obstructs or closes the runway, the other aircraft would not be able to land, and should have been turned back to its airport of departure.

== Airlines and destinations ==
Airlines	Destinations
LATAM Chile	Santiago de Chile

== See also ==
- Extreme points of Earth
- Shuttle Down, a 1980 novel by American author G. Harry Stine (Lee Correy), which gives a fictional account of the Space Shuttle Atlantis making an emergency landing at Easter Island following launch from Vandenberg Air Force Base in California
- Transport in Chile
- List of airports in Chile
- Point Nemo
