= Antennarius moai =

Scientific classification
- Domain: Eukaryota
- Kingdom: Animalia
- Phylum: Chordata
- Class: Actinopterygii
- Order: Lophiiformes
- Family: Antennariidae
- Genus: Antennarius
- Species: A. moai

Binomial name
- Antennarius moai (Gerald R. Allen etal, 1970)

Species of fish

Antennarius moai, commonly known as the Moai frogfish, is a species of fish native to Easter Island in the South Pacific. This species was discovered by Gerald R. Allen et al. in the 1970s. FishBase lists this taxon as a synonym of Antennatus coccineus.
