= Hotel Hanga Roa =

Hotel in Hanga Roa, Easter Island

Coordinates: 27.1511°S 109.4386°W

Hotel Hanga Roa, also known as Hanga Roa Eco Village & Spa, as of 2020 branded as Nayara Hangaroa, is a hotel in Hanga Roa, Easter Island, overlooking the bay on the Avenue Pont. The hotel was used extensively in the 1994 film Rapa Nui. In 1994, the hotel was purchased by the Panamericana hotel firm who extended the property with 10 fake thatched roofed bungalows, nine of which have three rooms. The 60 other rooms are located in the main building. Later, the hotel was acquired by Tanica hotels, owned by the Schliess family from mainland Chile. The Hito family, an extended family from Easter Island, occupied the premises for six months in 2010, claiming ancestral property rights. The hotel closed in 2011 for refurbishment and was projected to include a new museum and theatre, shopping complex, pool, tennis courts and other rooms. The hotel staff were mainly Rapa Nui locals, but the management was not from Easter Island. After a protracted conflict between the Hito family and the Schliess family, an agreement was reached in 2020. Under the agreement, property rights were transferred to the Hito family while the Tanica hotel group retained the right to exploit the hotel for 15 years. In 2020 the Costa Rican Nayara Resort group took control of the marketing.
