= Moai kavakava =

Type of small wooden figure

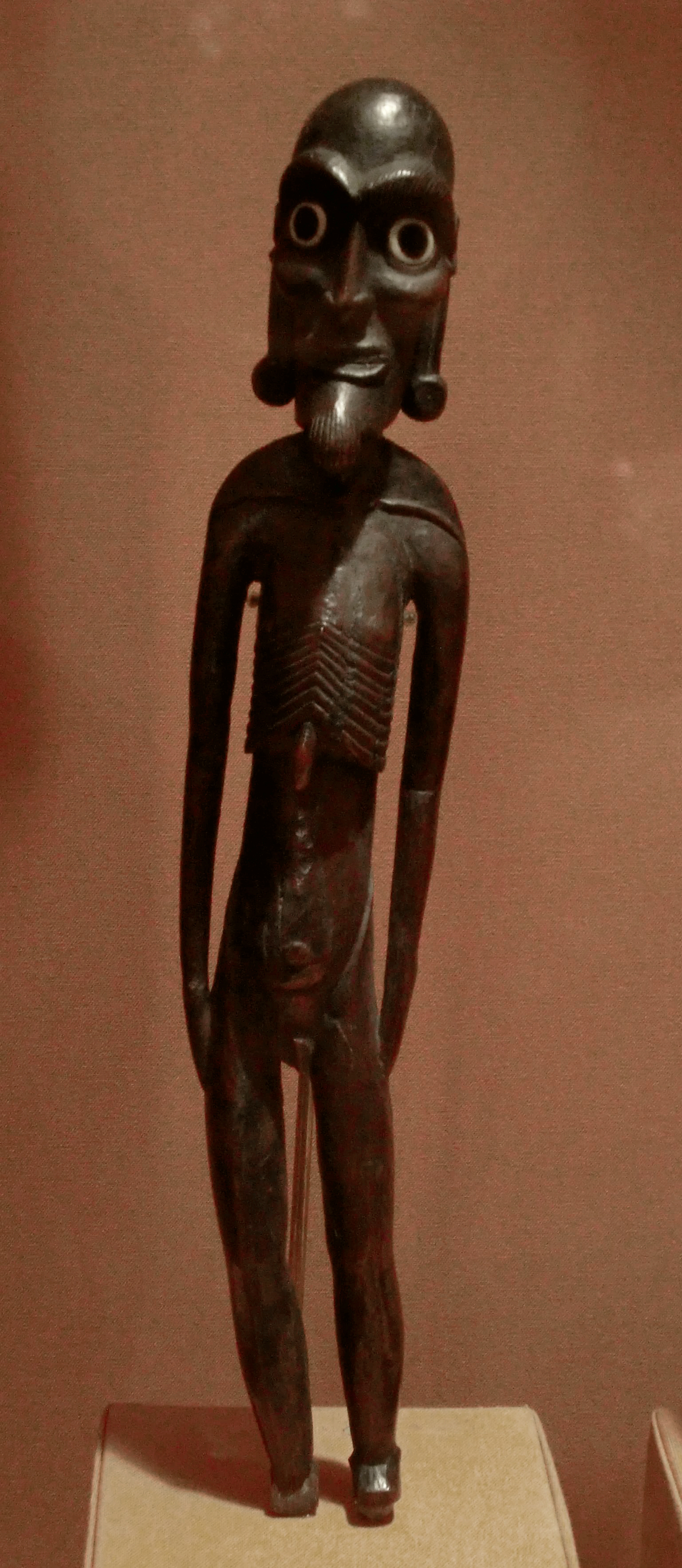
Statuette collected in the nineteenth century

A mo‘ai kavakava (Rapa Nui pronunciation: [ˈmoʔai ˌkavaˈkava]) is a small wooden figure of a style originated by the Rapa Nui culture of Easter Island.

Each figure resembles a standing, slightly stooped, male human with an emaciated body.

The name mo‘ai kavakava is formed from mo‘ai for the monumental monolithic human figures found on Easter Island and the word kavakava meaning ribs. Little is known about the cultural context of these figures although they are generally considered to be representations of starving ancestors or demons. 19th century travelers reported that these figures were worn hanging around the necks of men who took part in the ritual dances during public ceremonies.

German Expressionist Max Ernst was inspired by these figures and their rituals. The figures can also be found in the collections of the French surrealist André Breton.
