= Hanga Roa =

Main town of Easter Island, Chile

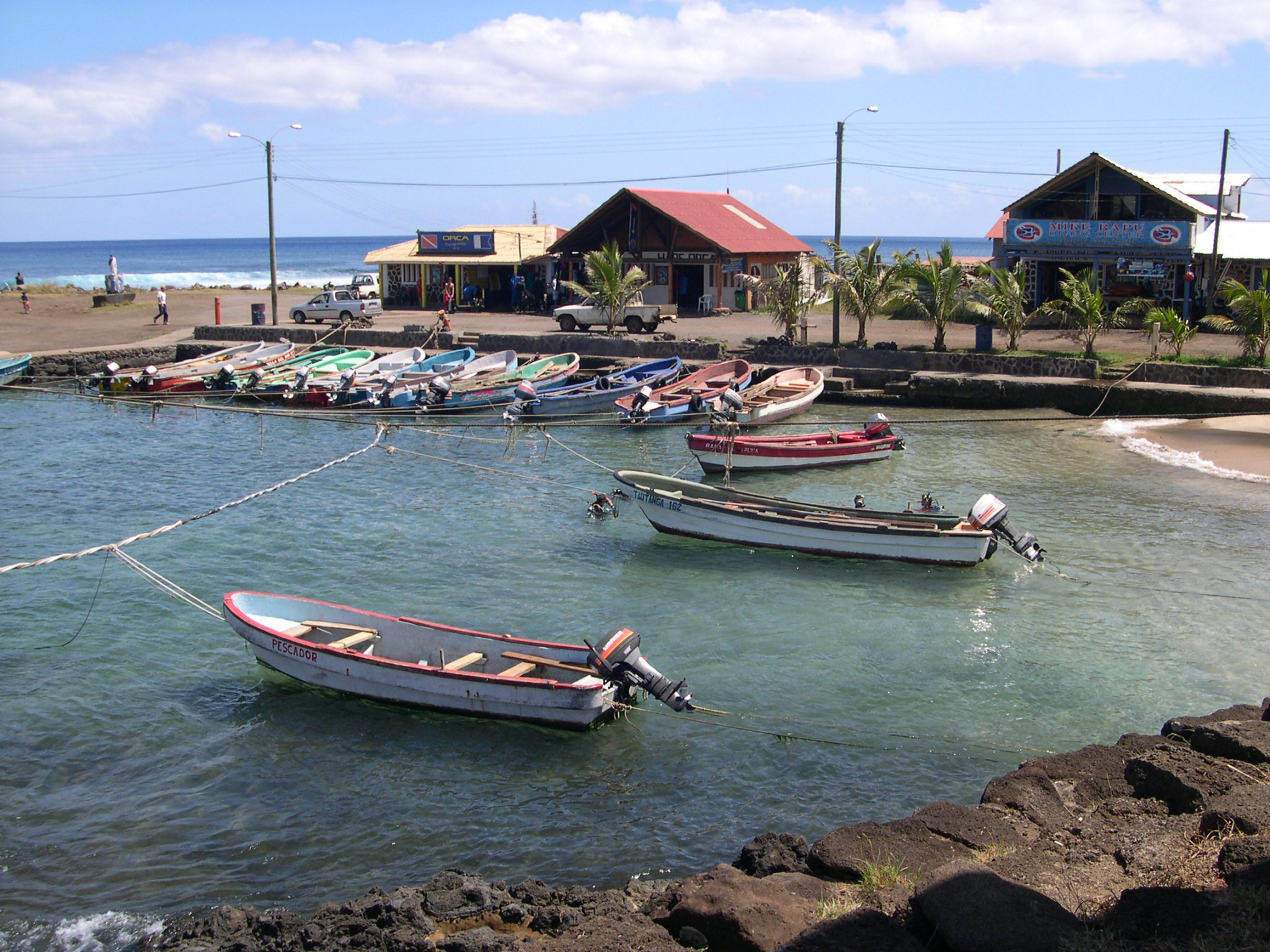
- Harbour in Hanga Roa
- Interactive map of Hanga Roa
- Location in the Pacific Ocean
- Coordinates: 27°08′S 109°25′W
- Country: Chile
- Region: Valparaíso
- Province: Isla de Pascua
- Commune: Isla de Pascua
- Founded: 9 September 1888

Population
  - Total: 7,322
- Time zone: UTC−06:00
  - Summer (DST): UTC−05:00
- Climate: Af

Hanga Roa (Spanish pronunciation: [ˈ(x)aŋɡa ˈroa]; Rapa Nui: Haŋa Roa [ˈhaŋa ˈɾoa], long bay or wide bay) is the main town, harbour, and seat of Easter Island, a municipality of Chile. It is located in the southern part of the island's west coast, in the lowlands between the extinct volcanoes of Terevaka and Rano Kau.

== History ==
In 1868 HMS Topaze anchored off Hanga Roa. At the time the Government of the area was known as the Conseil d’Etat. It was made up of Jean-Baptiste Dutrou-Bornier, Gaspard Zuhmbohm and four chiefs from the Miru clan.

Upon Chile's claim of the island, the Rapa Nui were forced into Hanga Roa, and the rest of the land was leased to a sheep farm. For much of the twentieth century, the rest of the island was leased to the Compañía Explotadora de la Isla de Pascua (CEDIP) (a subsidiary of Williamson-Balfour Company) and closed to the Rapa Nui.

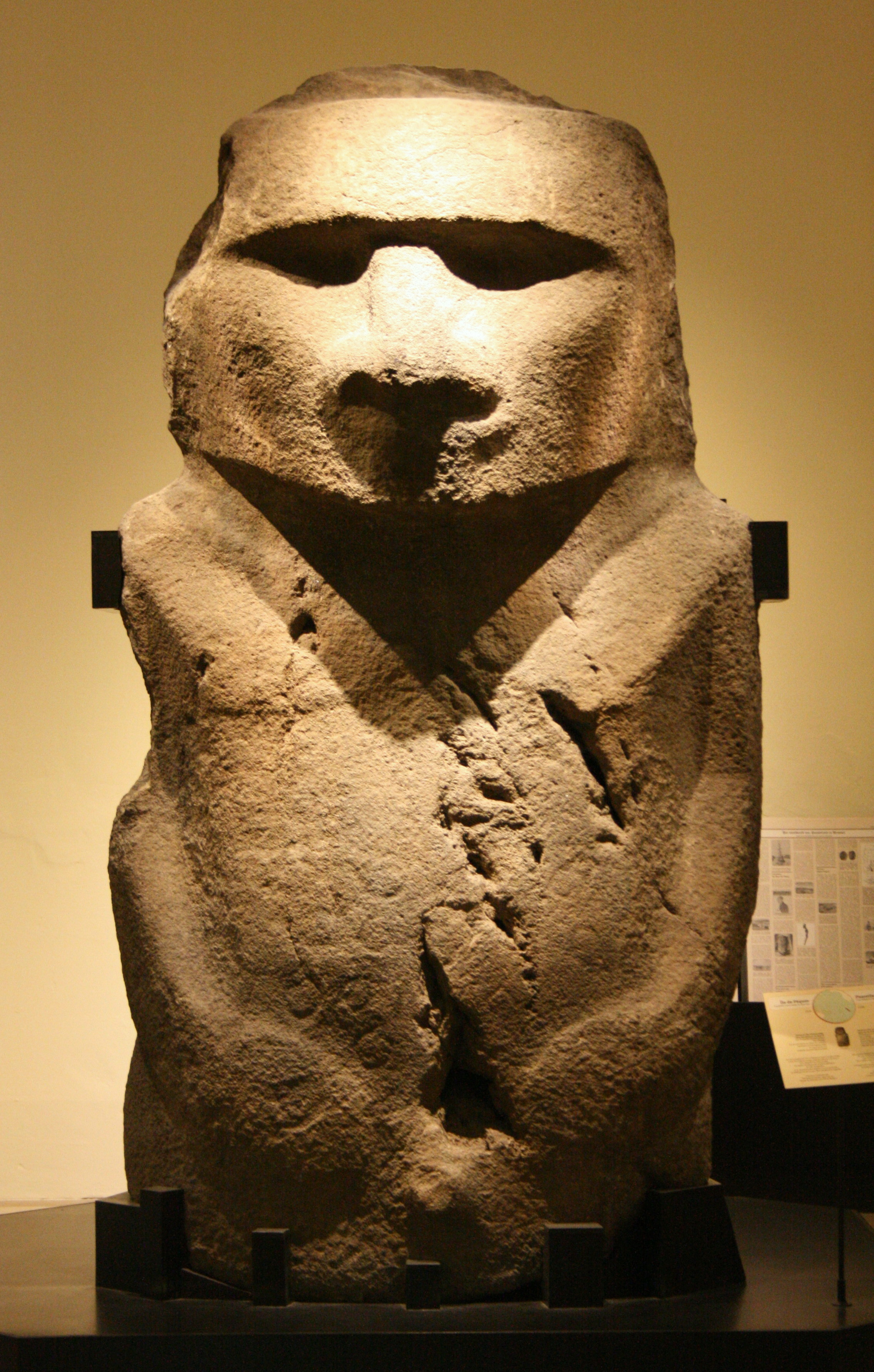
Statue of Pou Hakanononga, the tuna fishing god, Easter Island (end 13th century)

From December 12, 1934, to January 2, 1935, a merchant navy training ship anchored in the bay of Hanga Roa, allowing the landing of a Franco-Belgian scientific expedition. This expedition took a statue (that of Pou Hakanononga, god of tuna fishermen), now preserved in the Royal Museums of Art and History in Brussels, as well as a monumental head offered to the museum of the Trocadéro Palace in Paris. The inhabitants were not able to give their opinion on the departure of this statue, which was negotiated between the Franco-Belgian scientists and the Chilean colonial authorities.

Until 1953, most of the territory, under the control of the Chilean authorities, was used for sheep grazing by the Williamson–Balfour company. The indigenous inhabitants, for their part, were confined to the island’s only settlement, the town of Hanga Roa, and were forbidden to leave it. Hanga Roa has been compared to a ghetto by several Oceanist researchers. From 1953 to 1966, Hanga Roa and the rest of the island were under the control of the Chilean Navy.

The church of Hanga Roa and the parish of Santa Cruz were founded in December 1937. Its first parish priest was Father Sebastian Englert. Although he celebrated Mass in Latin, he preached, heard confessions, and catechized the faithful in the Rapa Nui language. He also translated popular Catholic devotions into Rapa Nui and encouraged indigenous religious singing.

In 1965, the United States Army undertook the construction of an airstrip near the village of Mataveri, close to Hanga Roa. In 1986, the United States extended the runway so that it could receive the American space shuttle in the event of an emergency landing for flights taking off from Vandenberg Air Force Base in California, but it was never used for that purpose. The following year, Chilean President Eduardo Frei Montalva promulgated Law No. 16,411 creating the Department of Easter Island (Departamento de Isla de Pascua), which also made it possible to grant Chilean citizenship to all the island’s inhabitants, along with the right to vote. This law also established the creation of an island municipality and formalized the installation of various public services of the Chilean state in the territory. The island was then attached to the Valparaíso Region of Chile. The first commercial air links between Santiago de Chile, Hanga Roa, and Papeete (French Polynesia) began in 1967 and were operated by the national airline LAN Chile.

During the last decades of the 20th century, the modest village of Hanga Roa was transformed into a small town with urban facilities including a market, school and church buildings, then later hotels, a bank and hospital. Various other administrative and commercial buildings were erected.

In 1999, Hanga Roa was described as “a large town with widely spaced houses, of which only the central streets were paved.” Many cars circulate in the town, as well as on the road leading to Anakena Beach, and according to the governor of Easter Island, the town is the Chilean municipality with the highest number of motor vehicles per inhabitant.

Some disagreements between the government of Chile and the Rapa Nui have led the locals with ancestral roots to "take over" many hotels in the city. For the locals, it is a way to draw the line between the Chilean government's policy-making in the island, and the Rapa Nui's ancestral rights on their land. In 2011, the Schiess family, owner of the Hanga Roa Hotel, donated back the land of the hotel to the Rapa Nui, but retained a 30-year management lease of the hotel. A week before, the Schiess family had personally shipped a special force squad from the Carabineros de Chile to remove the locals who squatted the hotel. A prior police intervention in August 2010 had led to 25 Rapa Nui protesters being wounded.

== Geography ==
The island's main avenue, Avenida Atamu Tekena (formerly Avenida Policarpo Toro), is the heart of the town. Many hotels, restaurants, grocery stores and pharmacies are found alongside this road. In 1998, the road was renamed after nineteenth century Rapanui king Atamu Te Kena; it had previously been named after Captain Policarpo Toro, the Chilean Naval officer who annexed Easter Island to Chile in 1888. The island's museum, and also the Roman Catholic "Holy Cross Church", are located in the center of town. With the advent of the Internet and the expansion of communication services by the Chilean government, many internet cafes and automated teller machines (ATM) have appeared in recent years.

== Population ==
In 1914, the population of Hanga Roa was just 250 and the rest of the island was inhabited by large populations of sheep.

The population of Easter Island was last measured at 7,750 people. The main town of Easter Island is Hanga Roa. Its population was last measured at 7,322 residents. This means that roughly 95% of the island's population live in this city.

== Economy ==
=== Tourism ===
The town has a number of hotels and guesthouses which cater for tourists who come to see the island's World Heritage Sites, in particular the famous moai statues. Hanga Roa and the surrounding area have a number of moai, but there are larger ones elsewhere on the island. Total capacity is about 2,500 beds as of 2022, ranging from camping sites to luxury hotels, including hotel Hanga Roa.

The Ahu Tahai archaeological complex is within a walking distance from the city's center. Every year, the city is home to the farandula cultural festival, a months-long event when the locals sculpt giant wooden statues. The celebration includes a habit where people get nude and bath in clay that covers their bodies.

=== Other activities ===
In addition to tourism, other businesses in Hanga Roa include fishing, farming and administration. Several Chilean government departments including the Chilean Navy maintain a presence on the island.

The harbour has a shipping service to Valparaíso, Chile. In April 2018, the freighter Lago Icalma, parked in the port of Hanga Roa, was struck by a barge. A fuel tank was ruptured, leaking diesel fuel in the waters of the port. The surrounding beaches were also blackened by the spread of the black liquid.

== Infrastructure ==
=== Transportation ===
The island's only airport, Mataveri International Airport, is served by LATAM Airlines, Chile's national carrier, which offers direct 5-hour flights from Santiago. It is the only commercial carrier that regularly serves the island.

=== Health ===
A new hospital was opened in 2013, replacing an older one donated in the 1970s by the United States. The hospital has a capacity of 16 beds, and includes a delivery ward designed to also allow the practice of folk medicine. It is the only healthcare facility on the island.

=== Education ===
Among several schools are the Colegio Lorenzo Baeza Vega, which offers primary education with a focus on teaching traditional culture and language, and Liceo Aldea Educativa, which offers qualification in the areas of humanist studies, tourism and agriculture.

== Sport ==
Hanga Roa has a multi-use stadium, the Estadio de Hanga Roa, which is the home ground of the CF Rapa Nui, the football team representing Easter Island.

== Access to food ==
The regular consumer brands sold in grocery stores are expensive due to the costly and time-consuming trip required to import those products. Locals informally sell fish, meat and vegetables. The tuna empanada is the city's favourite snack.

== Gallery ==
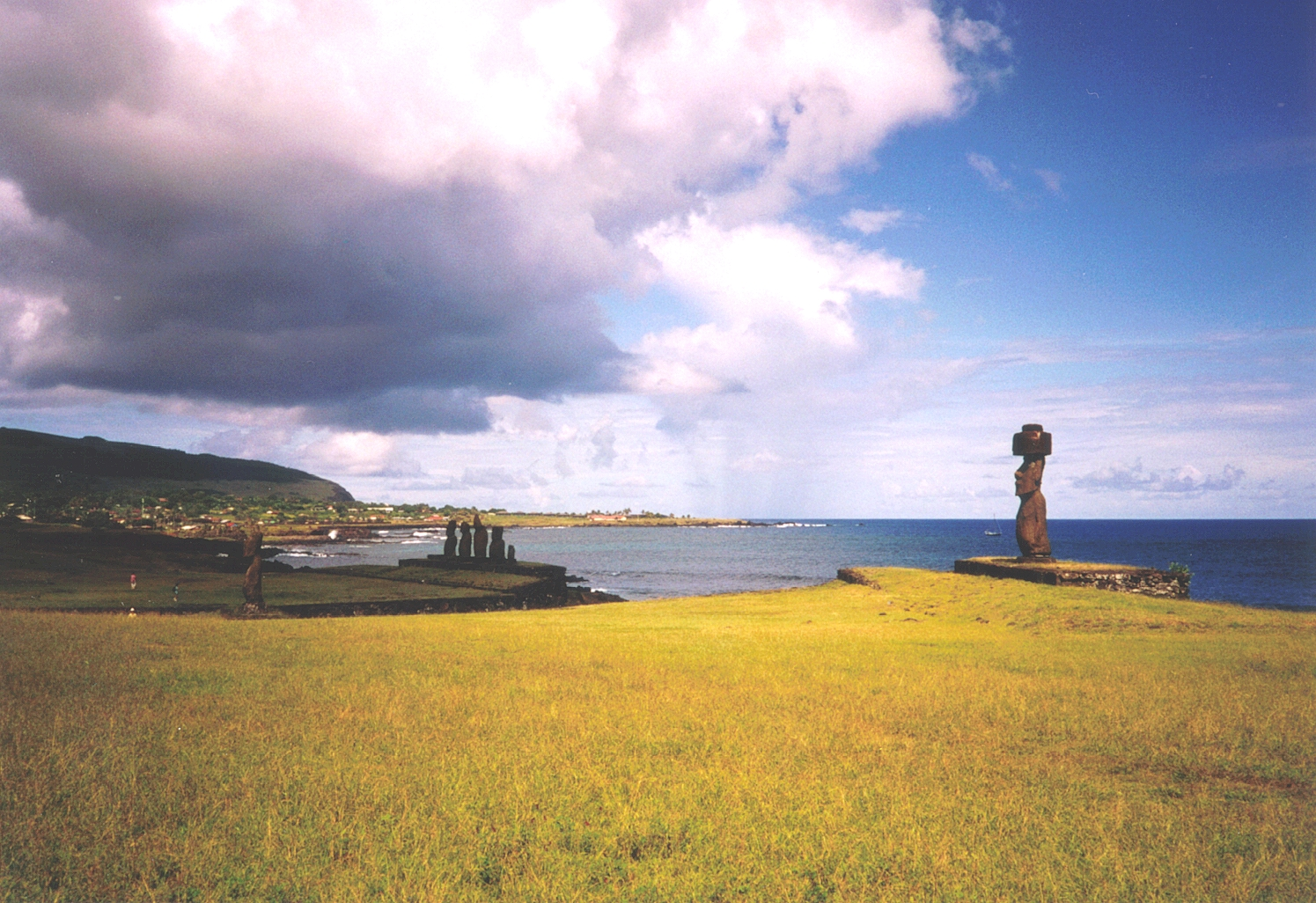
Several Hanga Roa moai, including Ko Te Riku (with a pukao on its head). In the mid-ground is a side view of an ahu with five moai. The Mataveri end of Hanga Roa is visible in the background with Rano Kau rising above it.

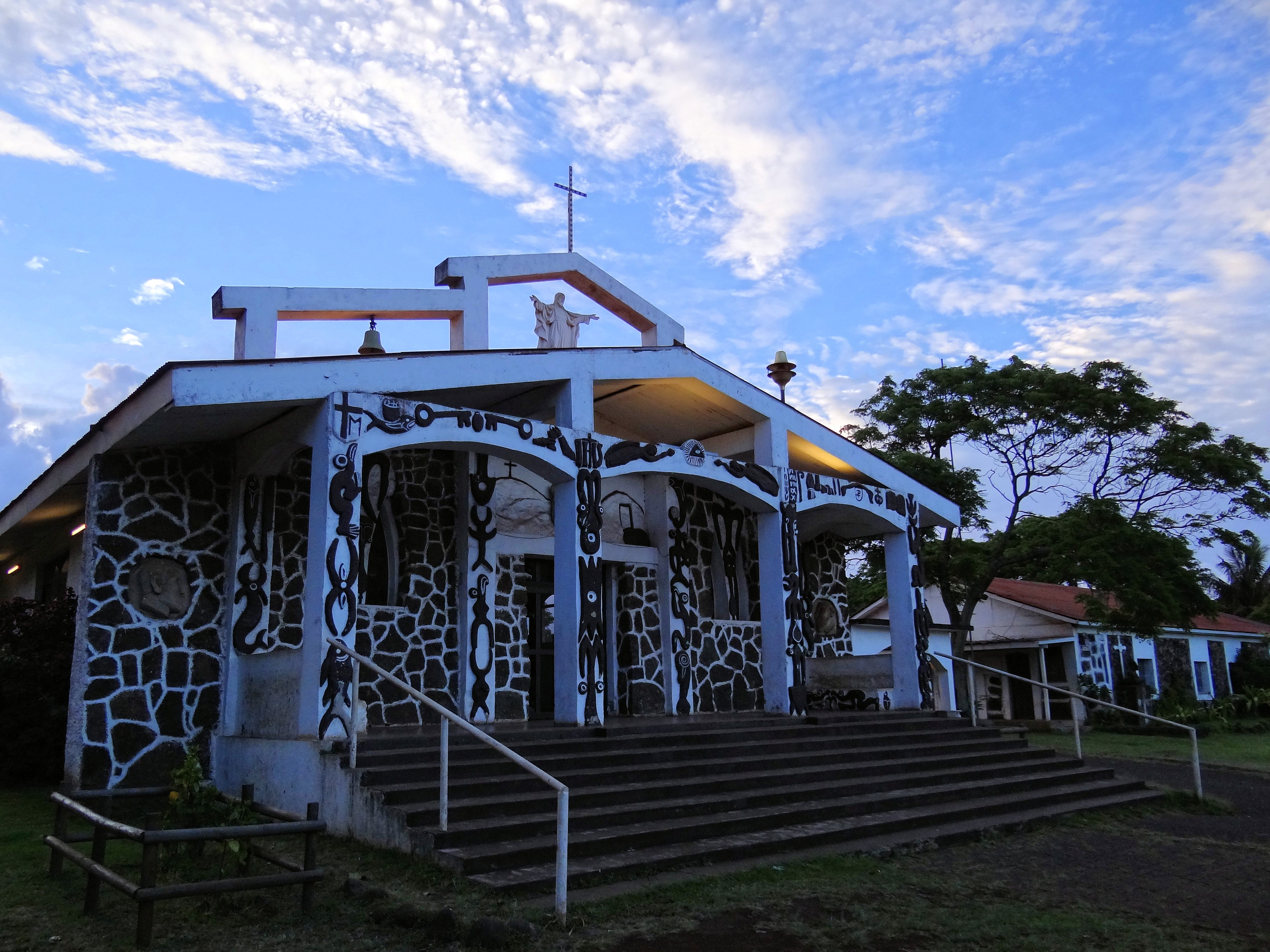
The Roman Catholic Holy Cross Church

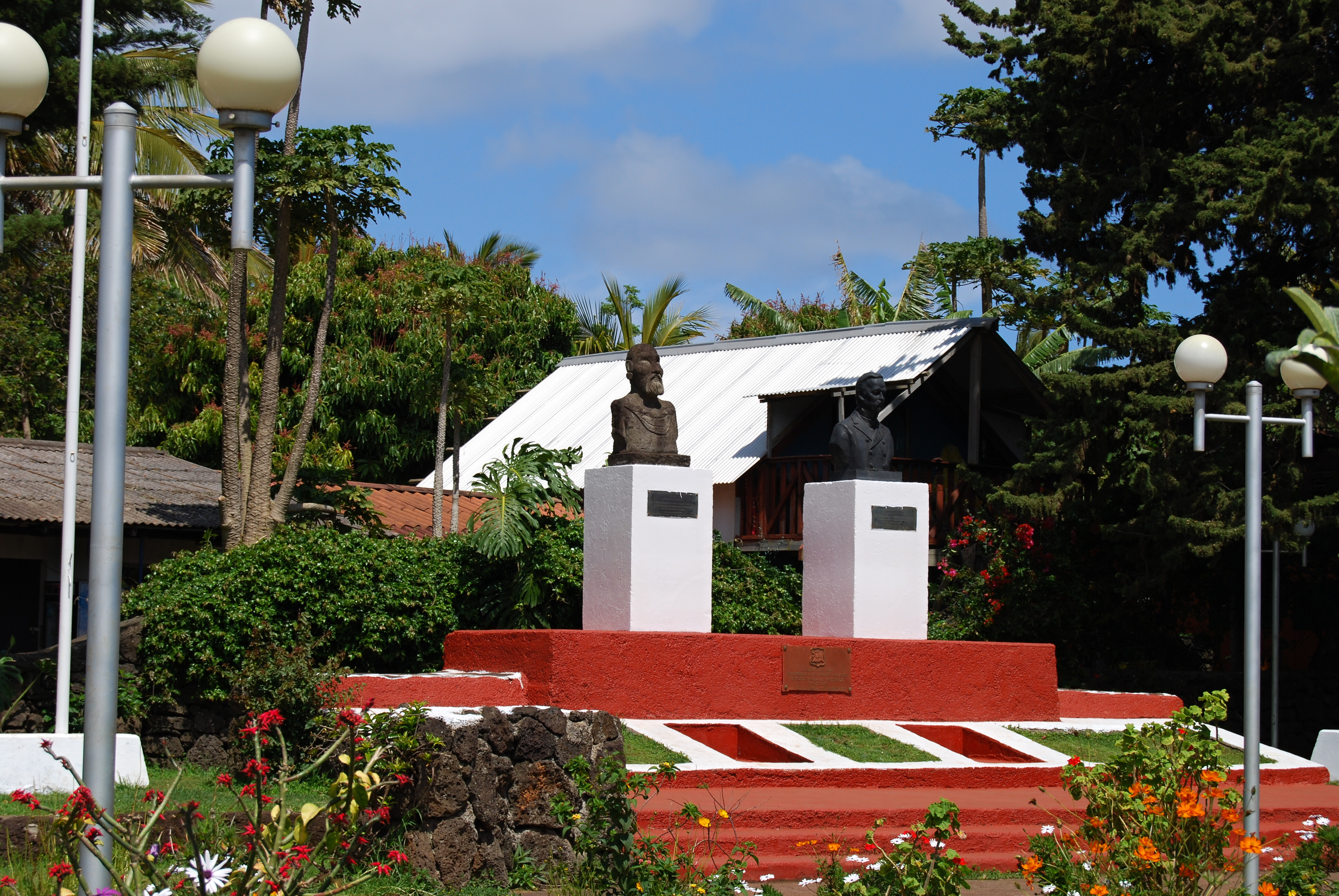
The "Plaza de Hanga Roa"

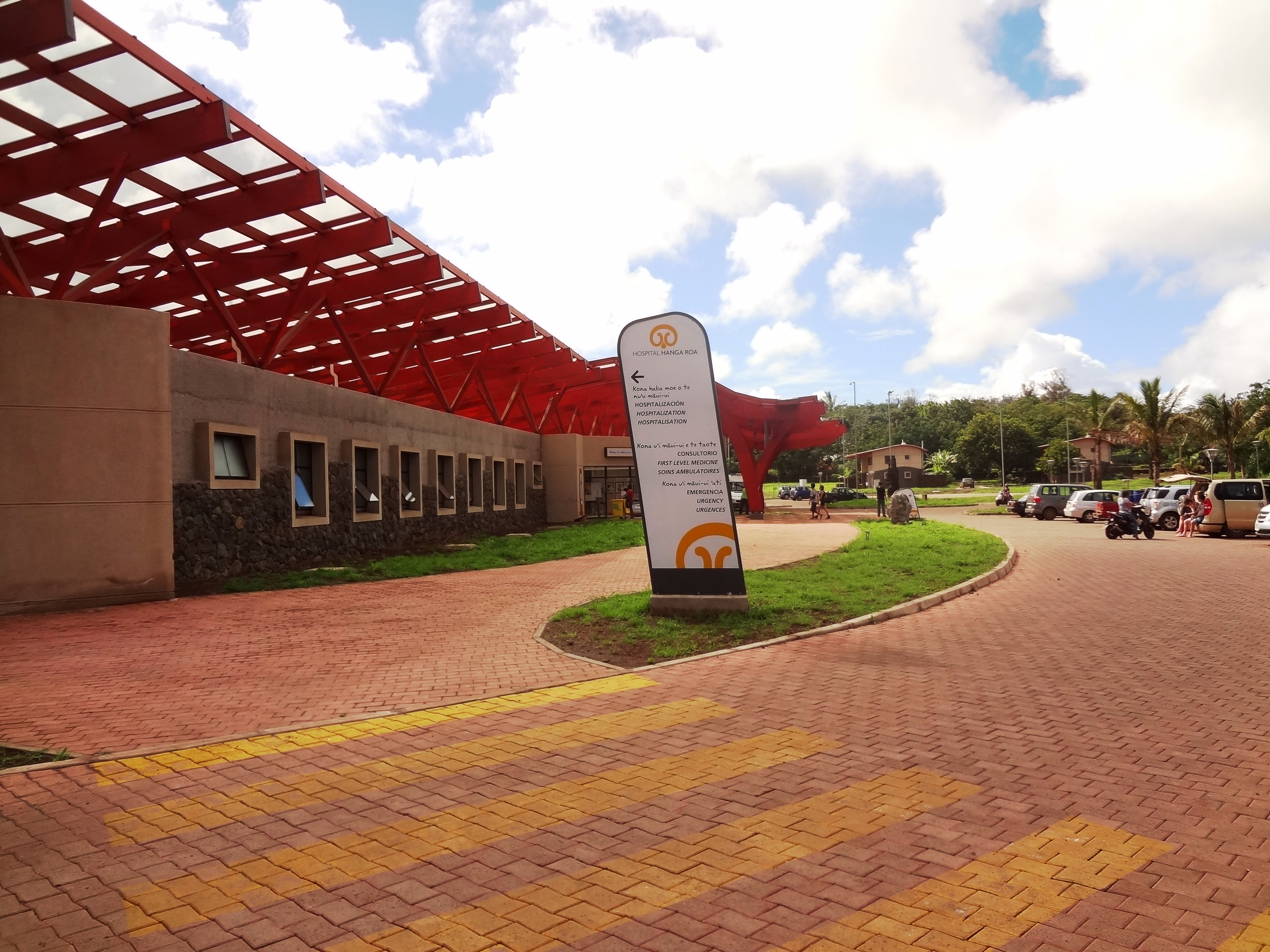
New Hospital of Hanga Roa

== See also ==
- List of towns in Chile
