= Adrienne L. Kaeppler =

American anthropologist and curator (1935–2022)

- Born: July 26, 1935; Milwaukee, Wisconsin, U.S.
- Died: March 5, 2022 (aged 86); Washington, D.C., U.S.
- Occupation: Curator of Oceanic Ethnology at the National Museum of Natural History at the Smithsonian Institution.
- Known for: Research on Tonga and Captain Cook

Adrienne Lois Kaeppler (July 26, 1935 – March 5, 2022) was an American anthropologist, curator of oceanic ethnology at the National Museum of Natural History at the Smithsonian Institution in Washington, DC. She served as the President of the International Council on Traditional Music between 2005 and 2013. Her research focused on the interrelationships between social structure and the arts, including dance, music, and the visual arts, especially in Tonga and Hawaii. She was considered to be an expert on Tongan dance, and the voyages of the 18th-century explorer James Cook.

== Career ==
Kaeppler attended the University of Wisconsin–Milwaukee, and received her master's degree and PhD from the University of Hawaii. In the 1970s, she was an anthropologist at the Bishop Museum in Honolulu, Hawaii. She taught anthropology, ethnomusicology, anthropology of dance, and art history at the University of Hawaii; the University of Maryland, College Park; the Queen's University in Belfast, Northern Ireland; Johns Hopkins University; and the University of California, Los Angeles. She was also a member of the State Council on Hawaiian Heritage. She was appointed by the Smithsonian Institution as Curator of Oceanic Ethnology at the National Museum of Natural History in 1984. In November 1990 Kaeppler gave the keynote address at the Taonga Maori Conference in New Zealand. In 1998, she worked in Tonga at the Tongan National Museum, setting up a special exhibition on the 80th birthday of King Taufa'ahau Tupou IV.

In 2004, she was vice-president of the International Council for Traditional Music, and she was elected as president in 2005, taking over from Krister Malm. She was a curator and anthropologist at the National Museum of Natural History of the Smithsonian Institution. Her research focused on material culture and the visual and performing arts in their cultural contexts, including traditional social and political structures and modern cultural identity. One such project was on tattoo practices of Rapa Nui, where she explored its significance for men and women, such as Ana Eva Hei.

== Personal life ==
Kaeppler was a majorette for her high school band, played violin in high school orchestra, and studied voice at the Wisconsin Conservatory of Music.

Kaeppler died on March 5, 2022, at the age of 86.

== Awards and honours ==
=== Honours ===
- Tonga:
  - Commander of the Order of The Most Devoted Royal Household Order of Tonga.

=== Awards ===
In 1978, Kaeppler was honored by the YWCA as a leading female scientist whose work increased the understanding of native cultures.

Kaeppler was also lauded for the book James Cook and the Exploration of the Pacific (published in 2009). The work was recognized with the 2010 First International Tribal Art Book Prize, organized by Tribal Art magazine in partnership with Sotheby's Paris Headquarters, and in April 2010, it was named Book of the Month by Hodern House in Australia.

In 2010, Kaeppler delivered a Smithsonian Secretary's Distinguished Research Lecture Award, which "recognizes a scholar’s sustained achievement in research, longstanding investment in the Smithsonian, and outstanding contribution to a field, as well as his or her ability to communicate research to a non-specialist audience."

== Publications ==
=== Selected writing ===
- Kaeppler, Adrienne L. (1967). The structure of Tongan dance (Doctoral dissertation). Honolulu: Anthropology Department, University of Hawaii.
- Kaeppler, Adrienne L. (1971). "Tongan dance: a study in cultural change". Ethnomusicology. 14 (2): 266–277. doi:10.2307/849801. JSTOR 849801.
- Kaeppler, Adrienne L. (1971). "Aesthetics of Tongan Dance". Ethnomusicology. 15 (2): 175–185. doi:10.2307/850464. JSTOR 850464.
- Kaeppler, Adrienne L. (March 1974). "Cook Voyage Provenance of the 'Artificial Curiosities' of Bullock's Museum". Man. 9 (1): 68–92. doi:10.2307/2800037. JSTOR 2800037.
- Kaeppler, Adrienne L. (1978). ""L'Aigle" and HMS "Blonde": The Use of History in the Study of Ethnography". Hawaiian Journal of History. 12: 28–44. hdl:10524/620.
- Poetry in Motion: Studies in Tongan Dance, 1993
- Hula Pahu. Bishop Museum Press. 1994. ISBN 978-0-930897-55-0.
- Polynesian and Micronesian sections of Oceanic Art, published in French, German, and English, 1993–1997
- From the Stone Age to the Space Age in 200 Years: Tongan Art and Society on the Eve of the Millennium, 1999
- Kaeppler, Adrienne L. (2001). "Dance and the concept of style". Yearbook for Traditional Music. 33: 49–63. doi:10.2307/1519630. JSTOR 1519630.
- The Pacific Arts of Polynesia and Micronesia, Oxford University Press, 2008
- Fleck, Robert (2009). James Cook and the Exploration of the Pacific. Thames & Hudson Ltd. ISBN 978-0-500-51516-7.
- Polynesia: The Mark and Carolyn Blackburn Collection of Polynesian Art. Honolulu, HI: University of Hawaiʻi Press. 2010. ISBN 978-1-883-52838-6.
- Holophusicon–The Leverian Museum: An eighteenth-century English institution of science, curiosity, and art. Altenstadt, Germany Honolulu, HI: ZKF Publishers, Distributed in the United States by Bishop Museum Press. 2011. ISBN 978-3-9811620-4-2.

=== Editing ===
- Co-editor, Australia and the Pacific Islands, volume 9 of the Garland Encyclopedia of World Music, 1998
- Kaeppler, Adrienne L.; Dunin, Elsie Ivancich, eds. (2007). Dance structures: Perspectives on the analysis of human movement. Budapest: Akademiai Kiado. ISBN 978-963-05-8542-2.
