= John Blacking =

British ethnomusicologist and social anthropologist (1928–1990)

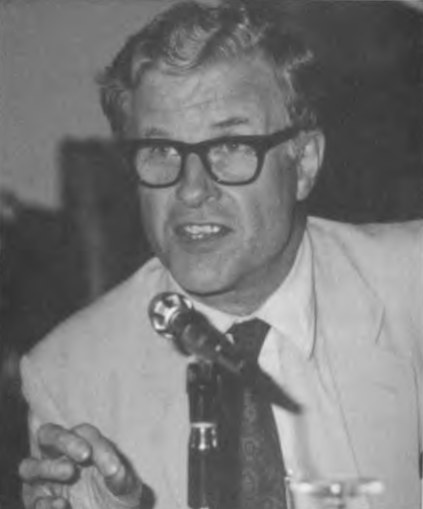
- John Blacking at a symposium in Muscat, Oman in October 1985.
- Born: John Anthony Randoll Blacking; October 22, 1928; Guildford, Surrey, England
- Died: January 24, 1990 (aged 61); Belfast, Northern Ireland
- Education: King's College, University of Cambridge, B.A., 1953; University of the Witwatersrand, South Africa, Ph.D., 1965; D.Litt., 1972
- Awards: Royal Irish Academy (1984); Rivers Memorial Medal (1986); Koizumi Fumio Prize (1989)
- Scientific career
- Fields: social anthropology, ethnomusicology
- Thesis: The Cultural Foundations of the Music of the Venda, with Special Reference to Their Children's Songs (1965)
- Doctoral students: Elkin Sithole, Max H. Brandt, John Baily, Gerd Baumann, Maria Ester Grebe-Vicuna, Jose Jorge de Carvalho, Laura Segato de Carvalho, Meki Nzewi, Fumiko Fujita, Joshua Uzoigwe

John Anthony Randoll Blacking (22 October 1928 – 24 January 1990) was a British ethnomusicologist and social anthropologist. Blacking began his career with a ground-breaking, 22-month study of the culture and music making of the Venda people of northern South Africa, from 1956 to 1958. In 1965 Blacking became a professor and head of the social anthropology department at the University of the Witwatersrand in South Africa. In 1970 he was appointed chair of the social anthropology department at Queen's University Belfast, Northern Ireland, where he developed a vibrant program in ethnomusicology, the first in Europe.

He is best known for his 1973 monograph How Musical is Man? in which he argued that the activity of making music is fundamentally important to humans, dependent on society and culture, but separate from the Western musical traditions and standards. He argued that music making was important to developing senses and emotional sensibility and that it is essential for balanced action and effective use of the intellect.

In 1969 Blacking and his then girlfriend and future wife, Dr. Zureena Desai, were arrested by the South African government and charged with violating apartheid's Immorality Act. Blacking was white, Desai was Indian, and the racial purity law forbade relations between different races. The arrest was motivated in part by Blacking's anti-apartheid activism. The trial received worldwide attention and embarrassed the government. The couple were found guilty and given suspended sentences, but Blacking was later banned from South Africa.

== Early life ==
John Blacking was born on October 22, 1928, in Guildford, Surrey to William Henry Randoll Blacking, an ecclesiastical architect, and (Josephine) Margaret Newcombe Waymouth. The three Blacking children comprised John, the oldest, and his two sisters. In 1930 the family moved to Salisbury, Wiltshire, where Blacking's father was appointed Architect to the Cathedral in 1931. Blacking's early education was at Salisbury Cathedral choir school from 1934 to 1942 and at Sherborne School from 1942 to 1947.

Growing up in the environs of Salisbury Cathedral, Blacking matured in a richly musical and Anglican environment. He was active in Cathedral functions, particularly choral music. He learned to play the piano from the Cathedral organist Reginald Moore, and he played pipe organ for school chapel service. Both the Salisbury Cathedral and Sherborne Schools had strong music programs. At Sherborne he studied part-time harmony, counterpoint, composition, piano, and organ. For much of his adult life he aspired and trained to be a concert pianist, while his initial career preference was to take Holy Orders in the Church of England.

== Military service and education ==
Blacking did his compulsory military service from 1947 to 1949, serving in the United Kingdom and in the Federation of Malaya (present-day Malaysia), then a self-governing colony of the United Kingdom. He served as a commissioned officer of the H.M. Coldstream Guards, leading a platoon in a campaign against communist insurgents. While in Malaya he learned the Malay language and was exposed to Malay, Chinese, and Indian cultures, which influenced his spiritual views and career choices.

After military service he studied anthropology and archaeology at King's College, Cambridge from 1950 to 1953. His professor, the South African anthropologist Meyer Fortes, noted that while Blacking was fond of anthropology, his active artistic life as pianist and promoter of contemporary music distracted him from it. Fortes suggested that he combine the two and arranged for him to spend the summer of 1952 studying ethnomusicology in the Musée de l'Homme in Paris with André Schaeffner.

After graduation, Blacking returned to Malaya with an appointment as Government Assistant Advisor on Aborigines. Being a trained anthropologist, an ex-army man, and speaking Malay, he was a natural choice for the job. Objecting to a military plan to forcibly remove forest peoples from the jungle, which would put them at risk of Western diseases, he was dismissed within a week of starting the job. He spent the next six months teaching at a secondary school in Singapore, radio broadcasting, going on a concert tour with violinist Maurice Clare as a piano accompanist, and writing an article on the musical instruments of Malayan aborigines. He returned to Europe in 1954, arriving in Paris to work with Suzanne Guébel towards becoming a concert pianist. These studies came to a forced end when he ran out of money. Fortuitously, at that moment, Hugh Tracey, the director of the new International Library of African Music in South Africa, was seeking an assistant and had consulted with Fortes about it. Fortes then wrote to Blacking about the opportunity.

== South Africa, the music of the Venda people, and the University of the Witwatersrand ==
In 1954 Blacking was employed by Tracey at the International Library of African Music (ILAM) in Roodepoort near Johannesburg as a musicologist for assistance in making recordings of African music. Assisting Tracey, he made two field trips to Mozambique and KwaZulu to record music. He was dissatisfied that the music acquired during their brief visits was only superficial, since the material became disconnected from the deeper language, social structure, and cultural context behind the performed music. Arguing that short expeditions were insufficient, he convinced Tracey to allow him to make a longer field expedition of musical research that would also employ anthropological field techniques.

Beginning in May 1956, he studied the music and culture of the Venda people in the Northern Transvaal during an intensive 22-month field expedition. Venda was an isolated Bantustan near the South African border with Zimbabwe. The expedition was one of the first to bring anthropological techniques to musical research in the field. The initial analysis of the material he collected was supported in 1959 by a scholarship from Cambridge arranged by Meyer Fortes. The data, notes, and analysis he collected were fertile ethnomusicological research material for the rest of his career.

In 1959 Blacking was appointed a junior Lecturer in Social Anthropology and African Government at the University of the Witwatersrand, and promoted to full Lecturer within a year. In 1965 he was awarded a Ph.D. from Witwatersrand, writing his dissertation on the cultural foundations of Venda music, with an emphasis on Venda children's songs. Also in 1965 he was appointed Professor and Head of the Department of Social Anthropology at Witwatersrand. The following year he was appointed Chairman of the African Studies Programme.

In 1964 he described the life of a Venda schoolgirl in the book Black Background, The Childhood of a South African Girl. The book was based on the autobiography of a girl named Dora Thizwilondi Magidi. In 1967 he published the book Venda Children's Songs: A Study in Ethnomusicological Analysis, one of the first ethnomusicological works to focus directly on the interpenetration of music and culture. The book was also an innovative study in ethnomusicological fieldwork. Drawing from his doctoral dissertation, Blacking showed that Venda children who attained proficiency in Venda songs also attained social assets. Later in life, Blacking felt the book was underappreciated and underacknowledged, partly due to its limited distribution from its publication in South Africa. It has since been reprinted by the University of Chicago (1995).

Blacking increasingly spoke out against apartheid, becoming a leader in the opposition to it at Witwatersrand. A popular lecturer, Blacking had a large student following. In 1968 he publicly defended the appointment of Dr. Archie Mafeje as a social anthropology lecturer to the University of Cape Town after Mafeje's appointment was rescinded due to political pressure. The government opposed the appointment because the University of Capetown was a white university and Mafeje was black.

== Arrested in 1969 ==
In 1967 Blacking began a relationship with Dr. Zureena Desai, a medical doctor. In January 1969 Blacking and Desai, were arrested and charged with violating South Africa's Immorality Act, an apartheid racial purity law. Their alleged specific crime was intercourse between two people of different races, Blacking being white, Desai being Indian. The case made headlines worldwide, and reporting of the trial was extensive.

The arrest was viewed by Blacking and others as probably motivated by Blacking's anti-apartheid activism. Blacking thought that the authorities expected he would jump bail and leave the country, noting they gave him opportunities to do so and did not take away his passport. Though the arrest was intended to shame the couple, they remained unbowed and unapologetic. Their case went to trial in March, which quickly became an embarrassment to the government. Evidence was presented that four policemen had observed the couple in their house during the evening of their arrest. The police peeked in the windows, and one policeman climbed a tree for a better view. The arrest was delayed until late in the evening to be sure evidence of a sexual liaison could be obtained. Upon entry to the house, the police felt the beds for warmth in an attempt to prove the couple was sleeping together. Desai later recounted that after they were arrested for being together, they were held in a jail cell together.

In April 1969 the couple were found guilty of “conspiring to commit carnal intercourse" and given a four-month suspended sentence. According to Desai, the judge was in the middle of announcing what was expected to be a draconian prison sentence, when he was interrupted by a phone call; he returned and abruptly declared the suspended sentence. However, in November 1969 during Blacking's first trip abroad after the verdict, he received an official letter stating he was not to return to South Africa. Five weeks later, Desai left South Africa, eventually to join Blacking in Northern Ireland. Blacking was unwelcome in South Africa for the rest of his life.

== Queen's University Belfast ==
By 1969 Blacking's work in ethnomusicology had become known in the United States, and after the trial he was offered and accepted a professorship in social anthropology at the Western Michigan University in Kalamazoo. Leaving South Africa, he wanted to travel straight to Michigan, but his American visa took a year to be granted, so he returned to Salisbury. While there, he was invited to apply for the new chair in anthropology at Queen's University Belfast in Northern Ireland. Offered the position, he accepted on condition that he be allowed to retain the professorship in Michigan during 1971. He took up the Queen's University position in July 1970 and left for Michigan in 1971, where he taught courses in anthropology and ethnomusicology. He returned to Belfast in October 1971, where he remained a professor of social anthropology at Queen's University for the rest of his career.

While Blacking was in the United States, he was invited to give a prestigious Jessie and John Danz Lecture at the University of Washington in Seattle. During a month-long visit, he gave the four lectures that formed the basis for his widely-read book How Musical is Man?, first published in 1973. The popularity of the book served to attract students to the growing ethnomusicology program at Queen's University.

In 1972 Blacking earned a Doctor of Letters (D.Litt.) degree from the University of the Witwatersrand for a collection of his published works, "Studies in the ethnomusicology of African musics".

From modest beginnings, Blacking expanded the Anthropology Department at Queen's University and developed it into an international center for ethnomusicology. Indeed, the degree program in ethnomusicology he founded, including both undergraduate and graduate levels of study, was the first in Europe. Two new permanent positions in ethnomusicology were established in the 1980s. Aided by scholarship support from the British Council in Belfast, the degree programs attracted students from around the world, drawn by Blacking's reputation and the liberal admissions policy he adopted.

Blacking's visits to Michigan and Washington were the first of several such international visits during the next two decades. He lectured at the University of Edinburgh in 1974, the University of Pittsburgh in 1980, the University of Western Australia in 1983, City University in London in 1983 and Goldsmiths' College in London in 1986. The lectures given in Australia formed the basis for the monograph A Commonsense View of All Music, published in 1987.

In 1981 Blacking became the only non-North American to be elected as chairman of the Society for Ethnomusicology, serving until 1983. That year he also founded the European Seminar in Ethnomusicology. He was active with the International Council for Traditional Music, known in Britain today as the British Forum for Ethnomusicology.

During 1987–1988, he wrote and presented a series of six, half-hour television programs entitled Dancing for Ulster Television. The programs were broadcast nationally.

== Ethnomusicology ==
In the field of ethnomusicology, Blacking is known for his early and energetic advocacy of an anthropological perspective in the study of music.

Many of his ideas about the social impact of music can be found in his 1973 book How Musical is Man?. In this book, Blacking called for a study of music as "Humanly Organized Sound", arguing that "it is the activities of Man the Music Maker that are of more interest and consequence to humanity than the particular musical achievements of Western man", and that "no musical style has 'its own terms': its terms are the terms of its society and culture".

Reginald Byron commented in his introduction to Music, Culture, and Experience: Selected Papers of John Blacking (1995):

"[In] How Musical is Man? [Blacking] made bold and sweeping assertions on sometimes rather slender evidence, and occasionally none at all, about the innate musical capacities of humankind, which reflected Blacking's belief that inherent musical ability is a defining characteristic of being human. This fundamental quality of being human, he argued, is systematically stifled in the West by elitist conceptions of music, which arbitrarily set standards of musical competence that inhibit the general participation in artistic creativity of which we are all capable. The world would be a better place, he thought, if like the Venda we were all able to communicate unself-consciously through music."

Blacking viewed music making and the arts as essential and defining activities of humankind stating:

"...the development of the senses and the education of the emotion through the arts are not merely desirable options. They are essential for balanced action and effective use of the intellect."

== Legacy ==
Blacking was a prolific writer, authoring 11 books and pamphlets, 81 articles on a multitude of subjects, and 4 records and videos. Over 50 post-graduate students earned their masters and doctoral degrees in "Social Anthropology (Ethnomusicology)" during Blacking's tenure at Queen's University Belfast.

The success of Blacking's book How Musical is Man? transcended the English speaking world. It has been translated into many other languages, including French, Greek, Italian, Serbo-Croatian and Japanese. The book was closely studied by Soviet ethnomusicologists.

In 2014 the Royal Anthropological Institute initiated an annual Blacking Lecture in ethnomusicology in his honor.

The Callaway Centre in the University of Western Australia holds an archive of his field notes and tapes, the John Blacking Collection.

== Personal life ==
In 1955 Blacking married Paula Gebers (christened Brenda Eleanora Gebers) just prior to departing on his 22-month expedition to the Venda in 1956. The couple had five children, but two died in childhood (1956 and 1963). Paula Blacking and the Blacking's three children remained in South Africa after John Blacking was banned from South Africa in 1969. John and Paula Blacking divorced in 1975.

Blacking and Zureena Desai married in 1978. They had four daughters. Zureena was the daughter of Suliman Mohamed Desai, a company director in South Africa, and Amina Desai, who in the 1970s was a political prisoner in South Africa for anti-apartheid activities.

Blacking often tried to apply anthropology to addressing local problems in Belfast and Northern Ireland. Such problems included trouble with the Belfast water supply, the provision of housing for homeless people, and "The Troubles", the Northern Ireland conflict, in the 1970s and 1980s. John Blacking House in Belfast was named after him, in honor of his involvement with the Open Door Housing Association.

Blacking was a serious piano player throughout his life. During his field work visiting the Venda in 1956-1958 he moved a piano into his rented bungalow to spend time playing, attracting attention from the Venda. He was the conductor for the Witwatersrand University Choir. He regularly gave solo piano recitals for lunch time concerts at Queen's University.

Blacking was diagnosed with pancreatic cancer in December 1988. He died on 24 January 1990 in Belfast at age 61.

== Books ==
- John Blacking, 1964. Black Background. The Childhood of a South African Girl. New York: Abelard-Schuman, 207 pp. ASIN B000WCR9NM, ISBN 978-0853891031
- John Blacking, 1995. Venda Children's Songs: A Study in Ethnomusicological Analysis. Chicago: University of Chicago Press, 210 pp. ISBN 978-0226055114 (first published 1967)
- John Blacking, 1973. How Musical is Man? (The Jessie and John Danz lecture series). Seattle: University of Washington Press, 116 pp. ISBN 0-295-95338-1
- John Blacking, ed., 1977. Anthropology of the Body. Proceedings of a conference of the Association of Social Anthropologists of the Commonwealth. London: Academic Press, 426 pp. ISBN 978-0121032500
- John Blacking and Joann W. Kealiinohomoku, eds., 1979. The Performing Arts: Music and Dance. The Hague: Mouton Publishers, 366 pp. ISBN 978-9027978707
- John Blacking, 1989. A Commonsense View of All Music: Reflections on Percy Grainger's contribution to ethnomusicology and music education, Cambridge: Cambridge University Press, 216 pp. ISBN 978-0521319249
- Reginald Byron, ed., 1995. Music, Culture, and Experience: Selected Papers of John Blacking. Chicago Studies in Ethnomusicology. Chicago: University of Chicago Press, 277 pp. ISBN 978-0226088297
