= Viriamo =

Tattooed woman from Easter Island (c. 1840 – c. 1941)

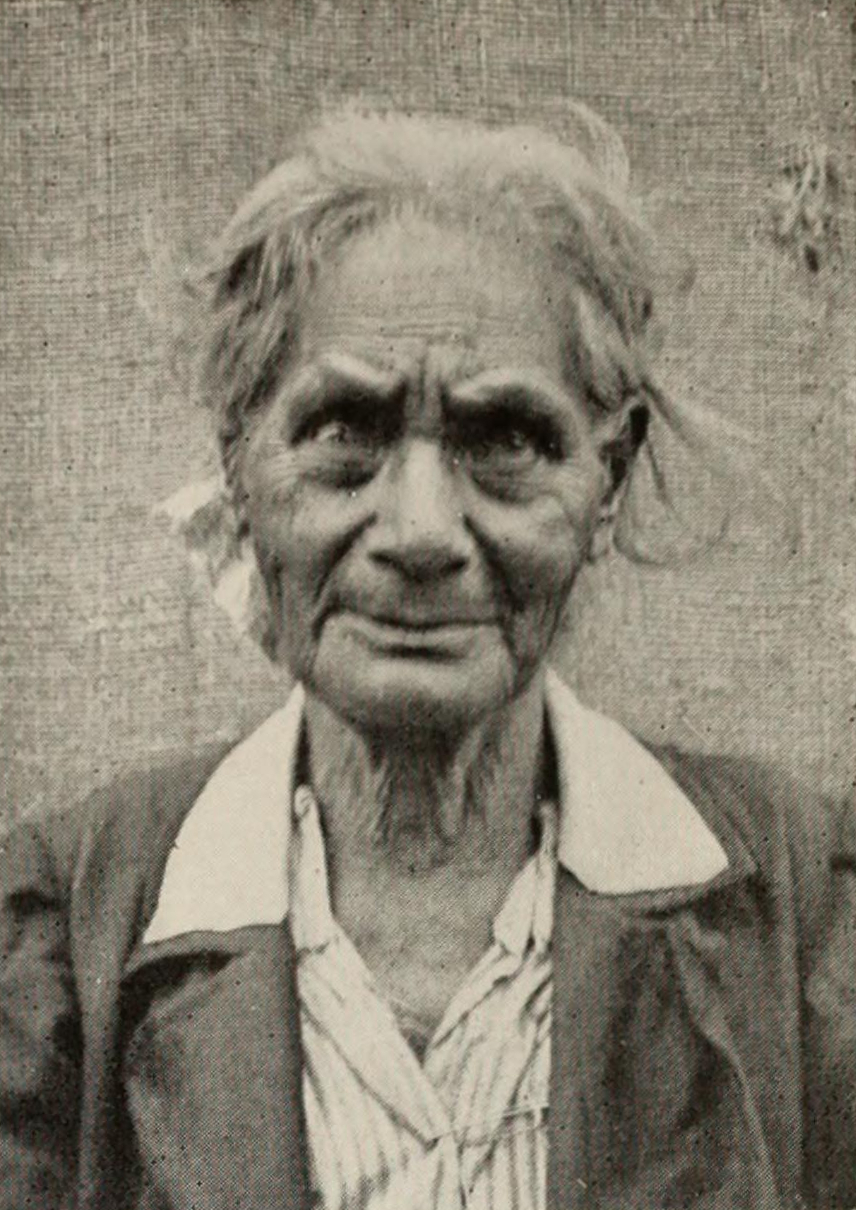
- Viriamo c. 1914–1915
- Born: c. 1840; Kingdom of Rapa Nui
- Died: 1941; Easter Island, Chile
- Known for: One of the last tattooed people of Rapa Nui
- Children: Juan Tepano

Victoria Veriamo a Huki a Parapara, also known as Viriamo (c. 1840–1941) was one of the last surviving indigenous women of Easter Island to have been tattooed using traditional practices, along with Ana Eva Hei. She was a cultural informant who shared her knowledge of indigenous Rapa Nui culture with European visitors, as well as with her son Juan Tepano, who in turn also functioned as a cultural informant.

== Tattoos ==
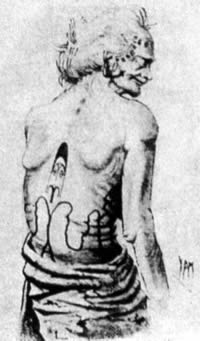
Viriamo, back view by Walter Knoche, 1911

Viriamo's face and body may have been tattooed by the catechist Tomanika Vaka Tuku One. Her face featured geometric stripes on her forehead and an adze-like design on her cheek, and her back was decorated with the ao motif, which symbolised a paddle.^{:35-6}

The tattoos of the Rapa Nui people were a subject of research by European colonisers, and Viriamo's body art was recorded by several people. It is likely that she is the 'chefess' recorded by Julien Viaud in his writings. Her back tattoos match those sketched by J. Linton Palmer in 1853; though she would have been older than he depicted at the time, it is thought that his drawings were idealizations.^{:36} Photographs of her were published in Katherine Routledge's The Mystery of Easter Island.

By 1930, Viriamo and Ana Eva Hei were the only two people on Rapa Nui to have traditional tattoos.

== Role as a cultural informant ==
When Alfred Métraux visited the island in 1941, Viriamo was "the only living person" to have "witnessed the functioning of the ancient culture". As a cultural informant, she shared information about the island's indigenous culture, including the practice of tangata manu, with visitors. She also shared information about indigenous deities, such as Tare and Rapahango.

== Personal life ==
Viriamo was born close to the Rano Raraku quarry. She was married three times. Her second husband was Vaka Ariki, with whom she had five children.^{:39} A son from her third marriage was cultural informant Juan Tepano.^{:39} Tepano told Métraux on his visit that much of his knowledge that he shared came from his mother, who at that time could no longer speak.
