= Chastushka =

Short Russian or Ukrainian humorous folk song

Chastushka (Russian: частушка, IPA: [tɕɪsˈtuʂkə], pl. chastushki) is a traditional musical genre of short Russian humorous folk song. Usually associated with high beat frequency, thus the name, coined from Russian: частый in the meaning of "quick". While the root of chastushki can be traced to ancient folklore of dance and wedding songs as well as performances of balagurs (Russian version of minstrels), the genre itself had crystallized fairly recently, in the last third of the 19th century, under the influence of social shifts caused by the abolition of serfdom and industrialization. Spread of the squeezebox in the mid-19th century and its use for the accompaniment created partial separation of chastushki from dance music.

In 1889, Gleb Uspensky was the first researcher to identify the new poetic form and assign the name "chastushki" to it. Typically many chastushki are sung one after another. Chastushki make use of a simple rhyming scheme to convey humorous or ironic content. The singing and recitation of such rhymes were an important part of popular culture of peasants and industrial workers in the late 19th and early 20th centuries.

The close equivalent of chastushki in the Western culture is limerick.

== Metre ==
Most chastushki use a single metre, trochaic tetrameter, making it easy to combine the verses and share the refrain, the syllables within the lines of a typical four-line verse are arranged as 8+7+8+7. Typical song consists of one four-lined couplet, full of humor, satire or irony.

== Form ==
The name originates from the Russian word "часто" ("chasto") – "frequently", or from "частить" ("chastit"), meaning "to do something with high frequency" and probably refers to the high beat frequency of chastushki.

The basic form is a simple four-line verse making use of an $\mathrm{ABAB}$, $\mathrm{ABCB}$, or $\mathrm{AABB}$ rhyme scheme.

Usually humorous, satirical, or ironic in nature, chastushki are often put to music as well, usually with balalaika or accordion accompaniment. The rigid, short structure (and, to a lesser degree, the type of humor used) parallels the poetic genre of limericks in British culture.

Sometimes several chastushki are delivered in sequence to form a song. After each chastushka, there is a full musical refrain without lyrics to give the listeners a chance to laugh without missing the next one. Originally chastushki were a form of folk entertainment, not intended to be performed on stage. Often they are sung in turns by a group of people. Sometimes they are used as a medium for a back-and-forth mocking contest. Improvisation is highly valued during chastushka singing.

== Content ==
Chastushki cover a very wide spectrum of topics, from lewd jokes to political satire, including such diverse themes as love songs and Communist propaganda.

=== Political subjects ===
Following the 1917 Russian Revolution, chastushki varied considerably in content from region to region. In some areas hit particularly hard by the grain requisitioning of the Soviet regime during the Civil War, such as Ryazan, peasant chastushki tended to be bitterly hostile. In other places, particularly those in close proximity to Moscow under Stalin's leadership, "Soviet chastushki" favorable to Stalin's Bolshevik government were sung and recited.

In the early 1920s chastushki were used by Young Communists in organized village gatherings as a form of anti-religious propaganda, subjecting the church and the rural clergy to ridicule using the traditional rural poetic form. Scholar Lynne Viola provides one such example of an anti-religious Soviet rhyme, rendered here in literal English translation:

All the pious are on a spree,
They see God is not at home.
He got drunk on homebrewed liquor,

And left to go abroad.

Given the difficult economic circumstances of the Soviet peasantry in the late 1920s and 1930s, many chastushki were of an anti-government form, with the singing of anti-Soviet couplets a common practice at peasant festivals of the period. Following the assassination of Communist Party leader Sergei Kirov late in 1934, chastushki sprung up relating the killing to a recent decision to terminate bread rationing, including this literal translation of one example provided by scholar Sheila Fitzpatrick:

When Kirov was killed,
They allowed free trade in bread.
When Stalin is killed,

They will disband all the collective farms.

== See also ==
- Bećarac
- Kolomyika

== Sources ==
- Stephenson, Robert C. (1962). "The Chastushka and the Limerick". Southwest Review. 47 (2). Southern Methodist University: 166–171. ISSN 0038-4712. JSTOR 43467391.
- Uspensky, Gleb (2011-09-30). Новые народные стишки [New folk poems] (in Russian). Litres. ISBN 978-5-457-12955-9.
- Zemtsovsky, I. I. (1982). "Частушки" [Chastushki]. Музыкальная энциклопедия [Music encyclopedia] (in Russian). Vol. 6. Moscow: Soviet Encyclopedia. pp. 197–199.
