= Frank Simon Hofmann =

Czech photographer

František Simon Hofmann
- Born: 27 December 1916; Prague, Austria-Hungary
- Died: April 14, 1989 (aged 72); Auckland, New Zealand
- Occupation: Photographer

František Simon Hofmann (27 December 1916 in Prague, Austria-Hungary – 13 April 1989 in Auckland, New Zealand), widely known as Frank Simon Hofmann was a Czech photographer who was recognised for his art in both Europe and New Zealand.

== Biography ==
Hofmann was born in Prague, the son of a prosperous Jewish businessman. He was givern his first camera by his mother at 13 to use on a trip to Venice, and at 16 joined the Prague Photographic Society.

In 1940, Hofmann fled to England to escape persecution during the Nazi German occupation of Prague. He arrived in New Zealand in 1940, first joining cousins in Christchurch, where he began working as a freelance photographer. He moved around the country searching for more permanent employment; first to Wellington, followed by Napier and eventually to Auckland.

In Auckland, Hofmann became deeply involved in Auckland's cultural scene: friends with artist Dennis Knight Turner, writer Frank Sargeson, violinist Maurice Clare, and architect Vernon Brown. Hofmann began working with Clifton Firth, and became a foundation member of the Auckland String Players (later who developed into the Symphonia of Auckland), where he played violin and later served as the management chairman).

In 1947, Hofmann joined Colonial Portraits as their manager of photographic production. There he met Bill Doherty, with whom he established Christopher Bede Studios, a commercial photography studio, in the early 1950s.

Hofmann's first solo show didn't come until 1959, an exhibition at the Photographic Society of New Zealand's Tauranga convention. There was a revival of interest in Hofmann and his work in the late 1980s as a retro icon of New Zealand modernist taste. A 1987 retrospective was mounted at Auckland's Aberhart North Gallery. In 1989 his work featured in a nationally touring show mounted by what was then the National Art Gallery, Object & Style: Photographs from Four Decades 1930s–1960s, and again in 1992 in the Auckland Art Gallery's The 1950s Show.

Hofmann died in Auckland on 13 April 1989. He was cremated and buried at Purewa Cemetery alongside his wife.

== Personal life ==
Hofmann married editor and poet Helen Lilian Shaw in Auckland on 24 December 1941. Together they had two sons.

== Photography ==
During his time at the Prague Photographic Society, he acquired a knack of both Romantic Pictorialism and modernist New Objectivity. Hofmann is widely seen as one of the leading figures of New Photography, which influenced the contemporary photography movement in New Zealand. His photographs were typically of urban landscapes.
