= Barbara Barnard Smith =

American ethnomusicologist (1920–2021)

Barbara Barnard Smith (8 June 1920 – 3 July 2021) was an American ethnomusicologist who founded and developed the field of ethnomusicology at the University of Hawaiʻi. She was the professor emerita of Music at the university. Although she was hired to teach piano and Western music, she believed that this would only further destroy indigenous Hawaiian and Pacific Island cultures, which were the ancestral heritage of most of her students. She, therefore, set about learning about and teaching how to rigorously study and write about local indigenous music and dance. Barbara Barnard Smith continued to advise PhD students on their dissertations almost up to her death at the age of 101.

She was the great-granddaughter of William Dewey Hobson, who was considered the father of Ventura County, California.

Smith began her career at the UH Mānoa in 1949 teaching piano and music theory, after earning her master's degree in music literature from the Eastman School of Music.

In October 1972, she edited a special edition of the Music Educators Journal to broaden the reach of ethnomusicology beyond specialists.

In 2009, she won the Fumio Koizumi Prize for Ethnomusicology for her work in both research and education with regard to expanding the knowledge and understanding of music and the peoples of Asia and the Pacific.

In 2013, she was made an honorary member of the International Council for Traditional Music, and later she founded the Barbara Barnard Smith Travel Award to support participation in an ICTM World Conference.
