= I Made Bandem =

Balinese dancer, artist, author and educator

I Made Bandem (born 1949 or 1950) is a Balinese dancer, artist, author, and educator.

Bandem served as the director of the Indonesian College of the Arts in Denpasar for 16 years. He was also the rector of Indonesia's oldest cultural institution, the Indonesia Institute of the Arts Yogyakarta. He is currently a professor of Balinese dance and music at the College of the Holy Cross in Worcester, Massachusetts, where he teaches music and dance dealing with the Bali-Gamelan.

As an artist and as a visiting scholar, Bandem has taught and performed Balinese dance throughout the world. In a 1990 profile, The New York Times described him as "the Joe Papp of Bali."

Bandem's contributions to arts and culture include achievements in ethnomusicology, educational administration, arts and culture management, and politics.

== Early life and education ==
Bandem studied Balinese dance from a very early age, and was performing Baris and other dances by the age of ten. One of the first Balinese dancers to study in the United States, Bandem earned his master's degree in dance from UCLA, and his PhD in ethnomusicology from Wesleyan University in 1980, the first Indonesian to do so.

== Ethnomusicology ==
As a scholar in the field of world music, Bandem fathoms and advances a school of thought popularly termed as the “bi-musicality” that was initially promoted by Mantle Hood. Bandem refers bi-musicality as a conception that music is a universal language and every ethnomusicologist must comprehend more than one genre of world music.

During his studies in the US, Bandem learned and came to terms with sounds and rhythms from around the world including music genre of Japan, Thailand, Korea, as well as China. In return, such experience gave Bandem the capabilities and firmness to conduct in-depth research of various Nusantara (Indonesian) music including Kalimantan, Sulawesi, Java, and Bali. Aside from immersing himself in the studies of world music, Bandem also mastered the integral aspects of dance and theatre – all influencing his scientific approaches.

As an ethnomusicologist, Bandem has published several books and academic articles pertaining to arts and culture. One highly regarded work is the book Kaja and Kelod: Balinese Dance in Transition (1981; reprinted 1995) and distributed by Oxford University Press, Kuala Lumpur. This book has induced worldwide appreciation upon the arts and culture of Bali. Other theoretical publications about music, dance, and theatre of Indonesia include Prakempa: A Cosmology in Balinese Music, Wayang Wong in Contemporary Bali, Traditional Theatre of Indonesia, and Encyclopedia of Balinese Dance – all these books are text books and reference for those studying Indonesian arts. Aside from writings concerning performing arts, Bandem also possess great interest in fine arts, and many of his articles are closely related to historical and aesthetic studies of Indonesian fine arts.

Bandem's commitment in ethnomusicology augmented with the establishment of an Indonesian music association namely Masyarakat Musicology Indonesia (MMI) by him and a group of friends in 1985. MMI hails from Surakarta, Central Java, and Bandem was the first chairman of the non-profit association. Today, MMI has advanced as Masyarakat Seni Pertunjukan Indonesia (MSPI), as a center for research, creation, and development of Indonesian arts, both classic and contemporary. With this organization, Bandem has managed to raise and popularize ethnomusicology as a major discipline in art universities in Indonesia.

In 1986, Bandem initiated The First International Gamelan Festival; an evaluation on the advancement of gamelan in the global milieu that was conducted in conjunction with the 1986 Vancouver Expo in Canada. During the festival, more than 250 delegates participated and represented gamelan (traditional Indonesian music orchestra) and ethnic music groups from all over the world. The festival is evidence that Indonesian music especially its various sorts of gamelan are integral part of the world music setting.

Bandem played an important role in the progression of Indonesian arts and culture through teachings in many universities including the University of Hawaii, University of California, Los Angeles, Wesleyan University, University of Maryland, Baltimore County and Brown University.

The outstanding response led to the amplification of studies upon the Indonesian arts and culture particularly in the learning of the music and dance.

Consequently, many leading universities in the United States of America, Canada, Japan and Europe sought the inclusion of Indonesian art and culture studies into their curriculum. According to Balungan and Ear Magazine, there are more than 300 active gamelan groups around North America, Europe, Japan and Australia.

In 2006, Bandem was awarded the Fumio Koizumi Prize for his dedication and long life achievement in the field of ethnomusicology.

== Educational Administration ==
After attaining his Ph.D, Bandem returned to Indonesia from the US and was appointed as the Chancellor of the Indonesia Dance Academy (ASTI) Denpasar by the Ministry of Education and Culture (1982). Since then, Bandem exerted great effort to amplify the institution's status to become Indonesian Arts College (STSI) Denpasar and now Indonesia Institute of Arts. The efforts to increase the status of the institution to a higher level is not only a matter of political administration, but more a struggle to advocate arts as science, to equally position art in contrast to other field of studies. This struggle becomes imperative as the majority of Indonesia still view art as a profession (vocation), not a substantial field of study.

Bandem's formulation of art from the perspective of ontology, epistemology, and axiology became the groundwork for the Ministry Department of National Education Indonesia to permit Indonesian art universities to conduct S-1, S-2 (Master of Art), and S-3 (Ph.D.) programs. Bandem's effort with the collective support from other art scientists in Indonesia entitled Indonesia Institute of Arts (ISI) Jogjakarta to conduct and award Doctor of Philosophy (Ph.D.) and Doctor of Creative Art (DCA) in the field of art.

As an educational administrator, Bandem was trusted by the Ministry Department of National Education Indonesia to lead ASTI Denpasar (1981-1989), STSI Denpasar (1989-1997) and ISI Jogjakarta (1997-2006). In his 25 years in office, many of his conceptions became the model for the development of art universities in Indonesia.

In 1998, Bandem successfully established Badan Kerjasama Perguruan Tinggi Seni Indonesia (Indonesia Art University Cooperative Board). This association has initiated and produced the “New Paradigm of Art Universities”, a manual being used as the foundation to conduct higher learning of arts in Indonesia. Bandem truly plays a central role in increasing the quality of art education in Indonesia.

In conjunction to his duties as Rector of art universities over the past 25 years, Bandem was also given responsibility by the National Government as Secretary and Consortium Member of Komisi Disiplin Ilmu Seni (Commission for Art Discipline) that is an integral aspect of Indonesian Academy of Sciences. Bandem was also member of Badan Pertimbangan Pendidikan Nasional (Advisory Board of National Education), an organization pertaining national education under the direct supervision of the President of Republic Indonesia. Bandem dedicated his ideas through this governing body to make education in Indonesia as education for unity in diversity and to influence the government to implement multimedia based education. In response to such policy, currently Bandem is the chancellor of a leading information and computer technology university in Bali.

== Arts and culture management ==
As an artist, Bandem also learns and performs the dances and music of other cultures. While Bandem is well known for his creative directing in monumental works in Balinese performing arts, he also masters the Gagaku and Bugaku, the classical Japanese music and dance that he learned from his teacher Matsaro Togi, a national treasure of classical Japanese dance.

Furthermore, Bandem is also a culture engineer. His policy on preservation and development of the traditional Balinese arts and culture is formulated into a strategic development plan termed Sustainable Development with Cultural Orientation. One interesting interpretation of this policy is Continuity in Change, an aspect elaborated and practiced in many occasions including the Bali Arts Festival.

Together with Prof. Dr. Ida Bagus Mantra, the Governor of Bali (1978-1988), Bandem is among the founding fathers and driving force behind the Bali Arts Festival. This annual event has become a mental model for the preservation and development of the Balinese arts and culture as a whole. Currently, The Bali Arts Festival has entered its 27th year

Bandem has been actively involved in outlining the annual theme of the Bali Arts Festival from 1980 to 1997, as well as being executive producer and creative directors of numerous performances for the festival.

The successful impact of the Bali Arts Festival as means for arts and culture development has influenced the province of Yunnan in China to implement such festival. Bandem became the consultant for the festival particularly outlining preservation and development strategies for the arts and culture of minority groups within.

Bandem was also the Artistic Director for many Indonesian performances in numerous World Expos and other International Arts Festival. These include Expo Vancouver (1986), Expo Brisbane (1988), Indonesian Festival in USA (1990, 1991), Expo Sevilla (1992), Hanover Fair (1995) and Indonesia Japan Friendship Festival (1997).

For his role and influence in increasing quality of output and abundance of art masterpieces receiving great reviews in and abroad, Collin's Guide to Bali refers Bandem as the "Bali Art Czar".

In 1997, Bandem also accomplished the establishment of the Museum Gamelan (The Museum for Musical Instruments of Indonesia) within the dynamic compounds of the Indonesian Arts College (STSI, now ISI) Denpasar. The museum itself holds the largest collection of musical ensembles native to Indonesia, where all musical ensembles as well as the hundreds of various musical instruments being displayed are intended to become a medium for arts education. The museum is equipped with an archive centre that holds various forms of recordings, all representing documentation of the arts and culture. Other collections on exhibit include dance costumes, masks, shadow puppets, sculpture and paintings.

His devotion to fine arts is profuse and is advanced through active participation within the fine art scene. Together with his diverse network of arts and culture enthusiasts, Bandem established the first ever Bali Biennale; the biannual visual arts exhibition in 2005.

The holding of both the Pre-Bali Biennale in 5 cities in Java and 9 venues in Bali, as well as the Summit Event Bali Biennale in 9 venues in Bali as well as the Cartoon Pavilion is a reconstruction upon the traditional creative propensities of Balinese visual arts, as creativity is not grouped on the base of its customary aesthetic style, school and movement but is viewed from the perspective of Bali as a geo-culture unity that corresponds to the greater multiculturalism in today's global society.

Bandem is the current chairman of the Bali Biennale Organizing Committee.

In 1994, UNESCO awarded the International UNESCO Music Council Award to Bandem as recognition upon his wholehearted attention and dedication upon the world of arts and culture as well as the implementation of his concepts.

== Political career ==
Bandem grew interested in the field of practical politics in senior high school and he has been trusted by his colleagues to lead a political organization called GSNI. Bandem not only took charge of the senior high school level organization, but also became the Vice Chairmen of GSNI for Bali.

During his time in the USA particularly in Hawaii and California, Bandem actively lead PERMIAS (Indonesian Student Association in United States of America). Bandem's extensive network abroad has been constructed since these times.

After completing his doctoral studies in USA, Bandem returned to Bali and continued his enthusiasm in Indonesian politics. Soon after his return, Bandem was appointed as the Vice Chairmen of the major political party Golongan Karya in Bali from 1982-1998. This position permitted Bandem to become a member of the Indonesian House Assembly (MPR-RI) as state representative for the Province of Bali (1988-1998).

During his time as member of the Indonesian House Assembly (MPR-RI), Bandem was elected as the Secretary and Speaker for the Ad Hoc II Committee that is responsible for strategies and decisions of the national politics. Through this committee, Bandem demonstrated his keenness for Indonesian character building from the viewpoint of arts and culture.

Furthermore, although unsuccessful, Bandem was supported by the Balinese public as candidate for the 1998-2003 Governor of Bali during the 1998 election.

Taken as a whole, Bandem's stance towards the significance of arts and culture as a vibrant counterpart to the pulsating dynamics of socio-culture, political, and technology represents a notion that arts and culture are imperative elements for peace, concord, and the betterment of the world.

His belief for cordial cross-border interconnectedness by the means of arts and culture has bestowed him the Habibie Award in 2003 from the Habibie Center.

His pro-active approach has emphasized the importance of arts and culture as a reflective conscious to attain harmony among nations especially between respective cultures and the global forces.
