= Fumio Koizumi Prize for Ethnomusicology =

Award in ethnomusicology issued in Tokyo, Japan

Fumio Koizumi Prize in Ethnomusicology
- Awarded for: Outstanding contribution to ethnomusicology
- Country: Japan
- Presented by: Fumio Koizumi Trust
- First award: 1989
- Website: http://www.geidai.ac.jp/labs/koizumi/awarde/index.html

The Fumio Koizumi Prize (Japanese: 小泉文夫音楽賞) is an international award for achievements in ethnomusicology, presented annually in Tokyo, Japan. The prize is awarded by the Fumio Koizumi (小泉文夫) Trust each April 4, the date of Fumio's birthday. The recipient receives an award certificate in addition to prize money. The winners must be present at the ceremony, deliver a prize lecture, and deliver another lecture at another Japanese university of his/her choice.

== Entry and prize consideration ==
Nominations for the Fumio Koizumi Prize can be made only by the members of the Fumio Koizumi Prize Committee. The prize Committee consists of seven members, outstanding Japanese scholars in musicology and ethnomusicology. Committee designates independent experts to evaluate each entry and discusses all the entries at the meeting, held in Tokyo in December. The winner can be a single scholar, of a group of scholars. The prize awarding ceremony is held in Tokyo, in April–May.

== History ==
The Fumio Koizumi Trust was established by Koizumi Mieko, widow of Professor Koizumi Fumio (1927–83), on October 11, 1989, to commemorate her husband's lifelong devotion to ethnomusicology and to honour individuals and organizations who have made significant contributions to this field. The first Fumio Koizumi Prize was awarded in 1989 to a British ethnomusicologist John Blacking, and to Ethnomusicology Research Group of Tokyo National University of Fine Arts and Music. Up to now, 27 individuals and 2 groups have been awarded this prize. List of the winners of the prize together with the reasons for the award can be seen at the Fumio Koizumi Prize in Ethnomusicology Website From 2009 year onwards presented prize lecture texts are also placed on the prize website.

== List of Recipients of the Fumio Koizumi Prize ==
1989

- John Blacking (Professor emeritus, Queen's University, Belfast, United Kingdom)
- Ethnomusicology Research Group of Tokyo University of the Arts

1990

- Suenobu Togi (東儀季信) (Lecturer, Department of Ethnomusicology and Systematic Musicology, University of California, Los Angeles, performer of gagaku, Japanese court music)
- Collection for Organology, Kunitachi College of Music, Tokyo

1991

- José Maceda (Professor emeritus, University of the Philippines)
- Kiyoshi Inobe (井野辺潔) (Professor, Osaka College of Music)

1992

- William P. Malm (Professor, University of Michigan)
- Shin Nakagawa (Associate Professor, Kyoto City University of Arts)

1993

- Bruno Nettl (Professor emeritus, University of Illinois)

1994

- Trần Văn Khê (Professor emeritus, Université de Paris Sorbonne-Paris IV; director, Centre National de la Recherche Scientifique)

1995

- Huang Xiangpeng (黄翔鹏) (Professor, Former director, the Music Research Institute, Chinese Academy of Arts)

1996

- Kazuyuki Tanimoto (Professor, Director, Hokkaido Ainu Culture Research Center)

1997

- Jean-Jacques Nattiez (Professor, Université de Montréal)

1998

- Yoshihiko Tokomaru (徳丸吉彦) (Professor, Ochanomizu University)
- Osamu Yamaguchi (Professor, Osaka University)

1999

- Tomoaki Fujii (藤井知昭) (Professor, Associate director, The Chubu Institute for Advanced Studies, Chubu University)

2000

- Michio Mamiya (Professor, Toho Gakuen School of Music, composer)

2001

- Junzô Kawada (Professor, Hiroshima City University)

2002

- Tukitani Tuneko (月溪恒子) (Professor, Osaka University of Arts)

2003

- Steven Feld (Professor, University of New Mexico)

2004

- Yamada Yôichi (山田陽一) (Professor, Kyoto City University of Arts)

2005

- I Made Bandem (Professor, Director, Indonesian Institute of the Arts – Yogyakarta)

2006

- Krister Malm (Professor, Gothenburg University)

2007

- Yuri Sheykin (Professor, Arctic State Institute of Culture and Arts)
- Gerald Groemer (Professor, University of Yamanashi)

2008

- Simha Arom (Directeur de recherche émérite au Centre national de recherches scientifiques)
- Satoaki Gamô (蒲生郷昭) (Emeritus researcher, National Research Institute for Cultural Properties，Tokyo)

2009

- Barbara Barnard Smith (Professor emerita, University of Hawai‘i at Mānoa)
- Joseph Jordania (Honorary fellow, University of Melbourne, Professor, Head of the Foreign Department of the International Research Centre for Traditional Polyphony at Tbilisi State Conservatory)

2010

- Shen Qia (沈洽) (Professor, China Conservatory of Music, Beijing)
- Charles Keil (Professor Emeritus, Department of American Studies, University at Buffalo, State University of New York)

2011

- Izaly Zemtsovsky (Former Visiting Professor, Music & Slavic Depts., Stanford University)
- Lee Bo-Hyung (李輔亨/이보형) (President, The Society for Korean Discology)

2012

- Murray Schafer (Professor, Royal Conservatory of Music, Toronto - The Glenn Gould School, composer)

2013

- Robert Garfias (Professor, University of California, Irvine)
- Opera Theater Konnyakuza (Tokyo)

2014

- Hamamatsu Museum of Musical Instruments
- Chen Yingshi (陈应时) (Professor of Musicology, Shanghai Conservatory of Music)

2015

- Margaret Kartomi (Professor, Monash University)
- Otanazar Matyakubov (Professor, the State Conservatory of Uzbekistan, Tashkent)

2016

- Alison Tokita (Director, Research Centre for Japanese Traditional Music, Kyoto City University of Arts)
- Patricia Shehan Campbell (Donald E. Petersen Professor of Music, University of Washington, music education-ethnomusicology)

2017

- Philip V. Bohlman (Professor, University of Chicago)
- Haruko Komoda (薦田 治子) (Professor, Musashino Academia Musicae)

2018

- David W. Hughes (Research Associate, Department of Music and Japan Research Centre, SOAS, University of London)
