= William P. Malm =

American musicologist (1928–2024)

William Paul Malm
- Born: March 6, 1928; La Grange, Illinois, U.S.
- Died: September 16, 2024 (aged 96)
- Education: University of California Los Angeles (PhD in Music)
- Known for: Study of music in Japan, teaching ethnomusicology
- Awards: Fumio Koizumi Prize (1992), Charles Seeger lecturer (2001), Honorary Member of the Society for Ethnomusicology (2004)
- Scientific career
- Fields: Ethnomusicology, East Asian studies, Japan
- Workplaces: University of Michigan
- Thesis: Japanese Nagauta Music (1959)
- Doctoral students: Judith Becker

William Malm (March 6, 1928 – September 16, 2024) was an American musicologist known for his studies of Japanese traditional music. As a composer, teacher, and scholar of Japanese music, Malm shaped the study of ethnomusicology in the United States. Malm authored the first major scholarly study in English of the history and instruments of Japanese music, Japanese Music and Musical Instruments (1959). He was a faculty member at the University of Michigan from 1960 to 1994. Malm served as president of the Society for Ethnomusicology from 1977 to 1979 and was named an Honorary Member of that organization in 2004. Malm was awarded the Fumio Koizumi Prize in 1992 for his contributions to the study of Japanese music. As the 2001 Charles Seeger Lecturer, Malm's address focused on the history and founding of ethnomusicology in the United States.

== Biography ==
Malm studied composition at Northwestern University, where he completed a Bachelor's in 1949 and a Master's in Music in 1950. From 1951 to 1953, he was an instructor at the Naval School of Music. He completed the PhD in musicology at UCLA in 1959, where he also taught from 1958 to 1960. The bulk of his academic career was spent as a professor at the University of Michigan, where he taught from 1960 until 1994. At Michigan, he began an ethnomusicology program and worked with the Stearns Collection of Musical Instruments. His book Music Cultures of the Pacific, the Near East, and Asia (1967) is an authoritative and widely used textbook.

Malm made significant contributions to the study of Asian ethnomusicology, particularly his fieldwork and research into music for dance and Japanese music. His primary research area was the music of the shamisen, including music of traditional Japanese Kabuki theatre and Bunraku puppet theatre. Pete Seeger writes of attending a recital of Joruri (Bunraku music) with Malm in Tokyo in 1963 where Malm translated three long scenes for him. Seeger also accompanied Malm to his Joruri lesson where Malm sang and recited long passages with the teacher playing the samisen.

Malm's book on Nagauta (music of the Kabuki theatre), which grew out of his doctoral dissertation, is one of the first detailed studies of a single genre of Japanese music to be published in English. In 1986 in New York when the To-on-Kai ensemble from Japan presented the first professional performances in America of Nagauta performed separately from Kabuki theatre, Malm published an article in The New York Times about the art form.

Malm died on September 16, 2024, at the age of 96.

== Select publications ==
- William P. Malm (1959), Japanese Music and Musical Instruments (1st ed.), Tokyo & Rutland, Vt.: C. E. Tuttle Co.
- William P. Malm (1963), Nagauta: The Heart of Kabuki Music, Westport, Conn.: Greenwood Press, hdl:2027/mdp.39015007996476, ISBN 9780837169002
- William P. Malm (1967), Music Cultures of the Pacific, the Near East, and Asia, Englewood Cliffs, N.J.: Prentice-Hall
- William P. Malm (1971), Introduction in Gagaku Court Music and Dance by Masataro Togi, New York & Tokyo: Walker/Weatherhill.
- William P. Malm (May 4, 1986). "Japanese Ensemble Gives New Life to Old Tradition". The New York Times.

== Honors ==
- Order of the Rising Sun, 3rd Class, Gold Rays with Neck Ribbon (2020)
