= Ana Eva Hei =

Queen consort of Easter Island

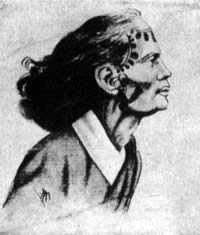
- Ana Eva Hei, profile view by Walter Knoche, 1911 (Note: A photograph of Ana Eva Hei can be found in: Kaeppler, Adrienne L. (2018). The iconic tattooed man of easter island: an illustrated life. Santa Monica, CA: EISP Foundation Mana Press, p.34.)
- Born: c. 1849; Rapa Nui
- Died: c. 1949 (aged 99–100); Easter Island, Chile
- Known for: Queen of Rapa Nui; One of the last tattooed people of Rapa Nui
- Spouse: Atamu Tekena

Ana Eva Hei, also Uka ʻa Hei ʻa ʻArero, or Reina Eva (Queen Eva) (c.1849 – c.1949), was the consort of the penultimate ruler of Rapa Nui, Atamu Tekena. She was one of the last surviving Rapa Nui people to have been tattooed using traditional practices.

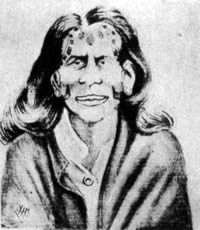
Ana Eva Hei, portrait view by Walter Knoche, 1911

Along with Viriamo, Ana Eva Hei was among the last surviving women from Rapa Nui to receive traditional facial tattoos. Her tattoos were described by Alfred Métraux, who undertook a research expedition to her home from 1934 to 1935. He stated that her tattoos included: "two parallel stripes crossing her forehead from one ear to the other and the inner edge of the ear tattooed ... The design on her lower jaw is composed of a triangular figure which meets an oval design, together forming an open angle. Her hands are covered with thin blue lines reminiscent of mittens." The singer and community leader, Luis Pate Paoa, remembered meeting her when he was a child, recalling that she danced and sang a song about cannibalism.

Drawings that have been reported to depict Ana Eva Hei were made by Walter Knoche in 1911. However, according to researchers Cristián Moreno Pakarati and Rafal Wieczorek, Knoche did not label the images, and thus, they have proposed some doubt over whether she is the woman depicted. However, Adrienne Kaeppler believed there is significant circumstantial evidence that the subject in Knoche's illustrations is her. This includes evidence where she appears in other's works; for example, a woman called Uaritaï, with the same tattoos as Ana Eva Hei, is recorded by Julien Viaud in his writings.

Married to King Atamu Tekena, records of the number of their children differ: according to Adrienne Kaeppler, they had fourteen children; but according to Cristián Moreno Pakarati, they had six.
