= Helen Shaw (writer) =

New Zealand short-story writer, poet, and editor

Helen Lilian Shaw (20 February 1913 – 13 June 1985) was a New Zealand short-story writer, poet and editor. She was born in Timaru, New Zealand, in 1913.

Shaw met Czech-New Zealand photographer Frank Simon Hofmann in Christchurch in 1940. Together they moved to Auckland, where they wed on 24 December 1941.

Shaw died 13th June, 1985, aged 72. She was cremated and buried at Purewa Cemetery, Auckland.
