= Hamamatsu Museum of Musical Instruments =

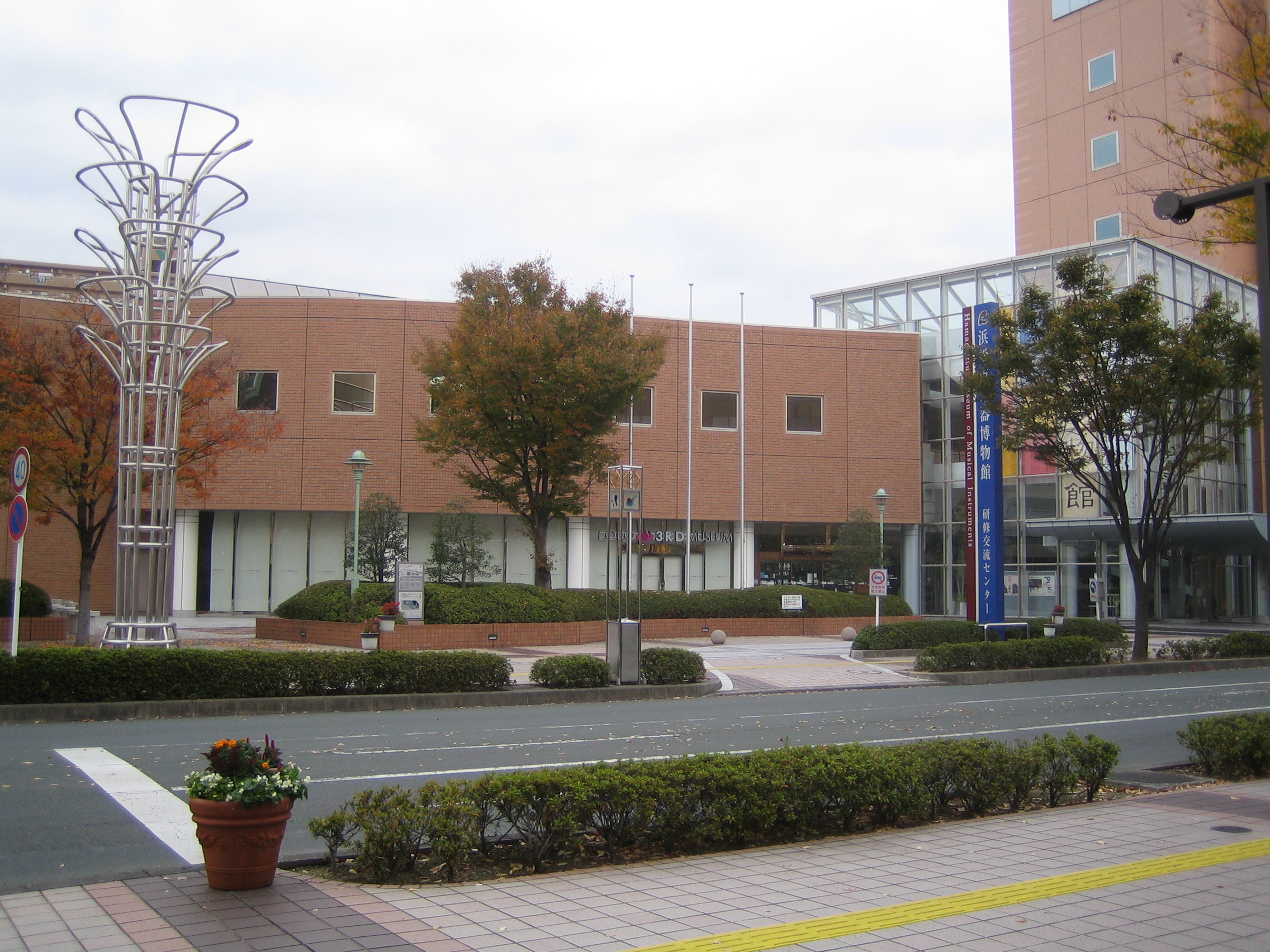
- Established: 1995
- Location: Hamamatsu, Japan
- Coordinates: 34.706612°N 137.738519°E
- Type: Musical instrument museum
- Website: www.gakkihaku.jp/en/

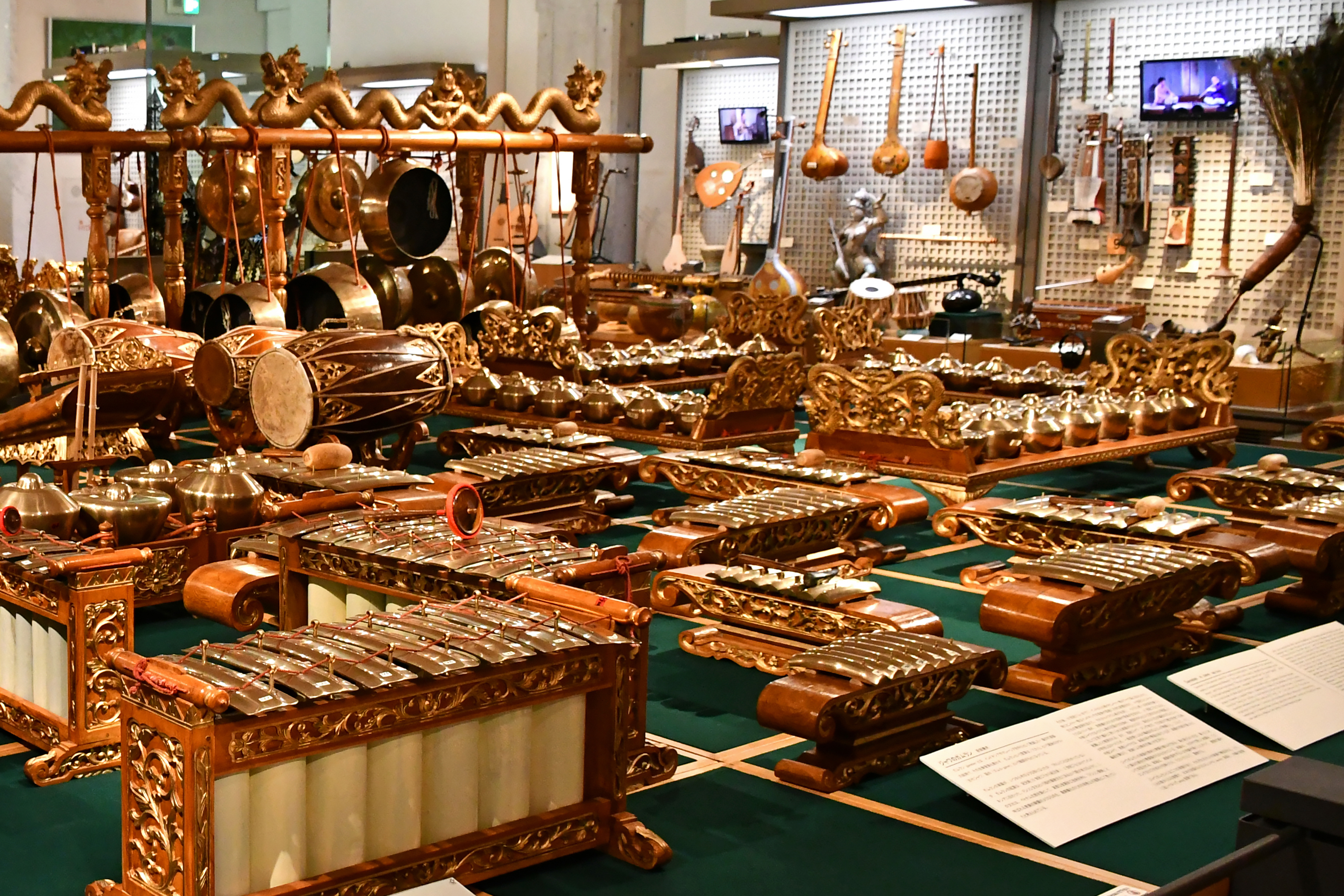
Asian instruments on display at Exhibition Room 1

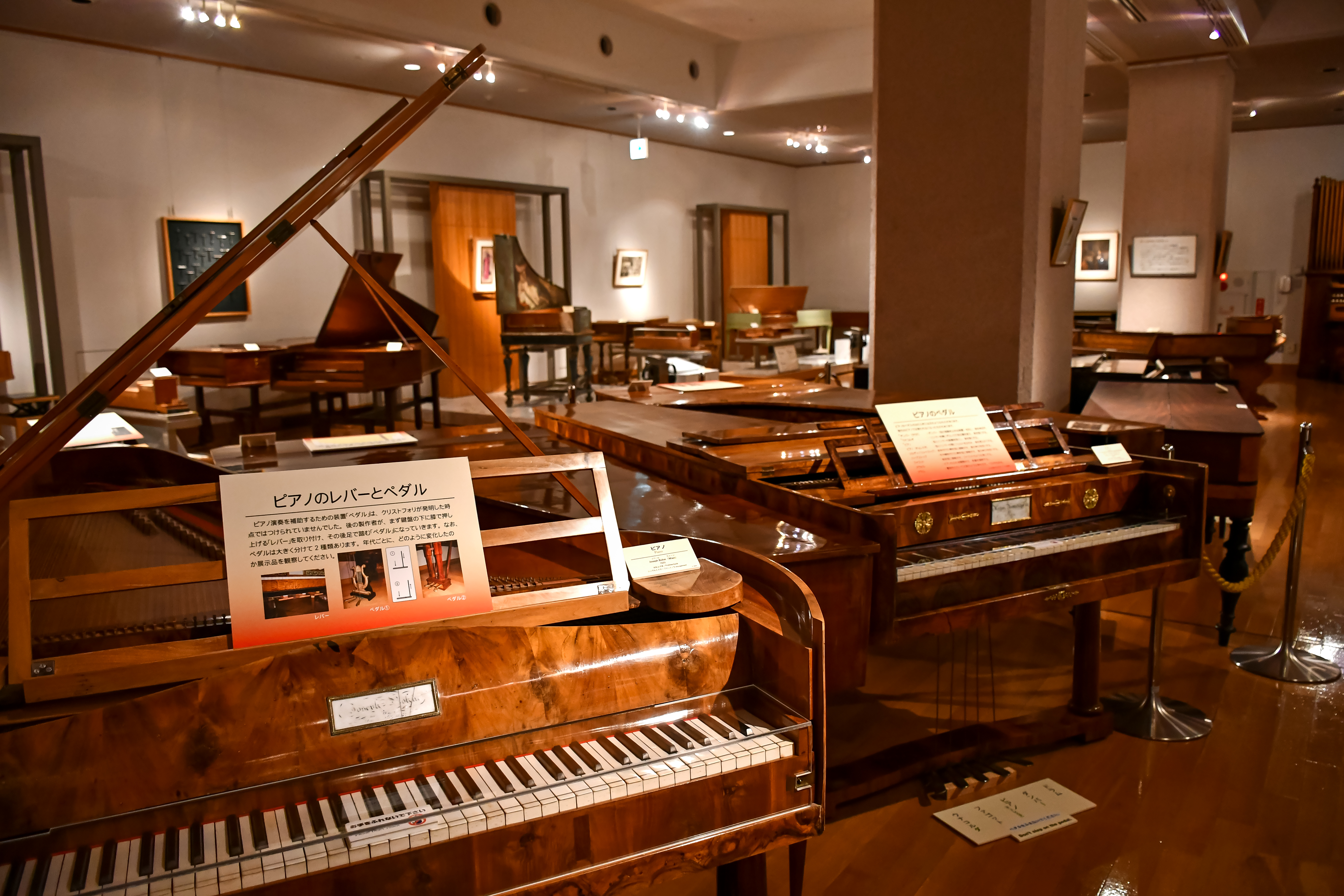
Historical pianos at Exhibition Room 3.

The Hamamatsu Museum of Musical Instruments (Japanese: 浜松市楽器博物館) is a museum in Hamamatsu, Japan. It is the first public museum about musical instruments in Japan. The museum contains collections of different types of instruments from various parts of the world.

== History ==
The museum was inaugurated in April 1995. In 2014, the museum received the Fumio Koizumi Music Prize. In the museum, concerts are performed with instruments of historical value, these concerts are recorded on CDs, and sold on albums under the name of "Hamamatsu City Musical Instrument Museum Collection Series", these albums are used in music education venues. Since 2014, the museum has been part of the Google Arts & Culture platform. In 2020, the museum organised the special 250th anniversary exhibition of Beethoven's masterpiece. In October 2021, in collaboration with Yamaha, the museum launched the exhibition "Real Sound Viewing Chikuzen Biwa Performance Reproduction".

== Collections ==
The museum contains:

- around 1500 musical instruments, among them pianos made in the 19th century. instruments from different parts of the world, including a collection of percussion instruments from Myanmar, called Hsaing waing, as well as gamelans from Bali and Java;
- 200 exhibits on Japanese musical instruments;
- a section about electronic music with synthesizers, organs and electronic guitars, rhythm machines of musical instrument manufacturers such as Yamaha, Casio or Korg, the Moog synthesizer and the Roland System 700;
- an organ made by Shohei Tanaka, as well as a Yamato organ belonging to the Meiji and Taisho eras.

Among the Japanese instruments housed in the museum are Taishōgotos. The museum also has the Korg M01 on display.

== Exhibitions ==
In 2015, following the 20th anniversary of the museum, an exhibition about reed organs called "The happiness from the Reed Organ: Western Music, School Education and Hamamatsu in Modern Japan" was organized, in this exhibition the "Tsuru Sho" organ, one of the oldest confirmed organs produced by Yamaha in 1881, an organ from the United States made in 1891, an organ used in schools during the Meiji period and a Yamato organ were displayed.

In August 2021, the museum presented an exhibition about the history of the Biwa, this exhibition explains the creation of Biwa types such as Heike-biwa and Satsuma-biwa dating back to the 7th and 8th centuries, when they were introduced to Japan. A European and Arabian lutes, as well as a Chinese pipe, were also on display.
