= Rapa Nui tattooing =

Tattooing among Rapa Nui people

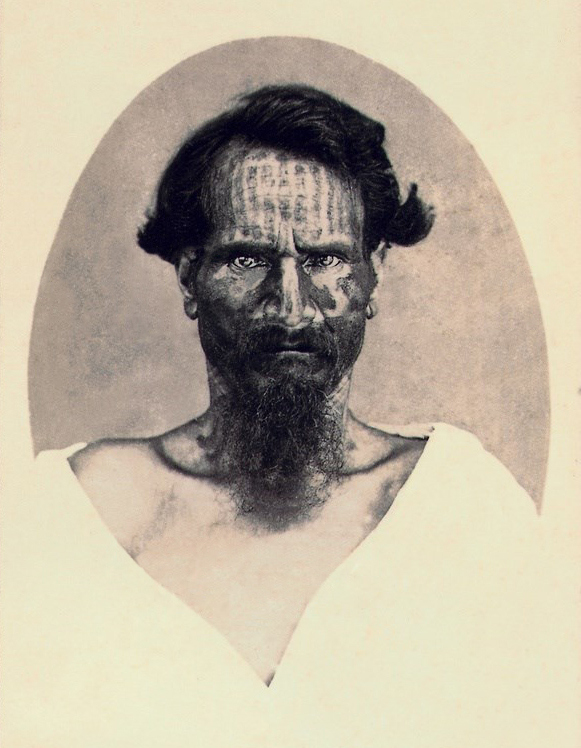
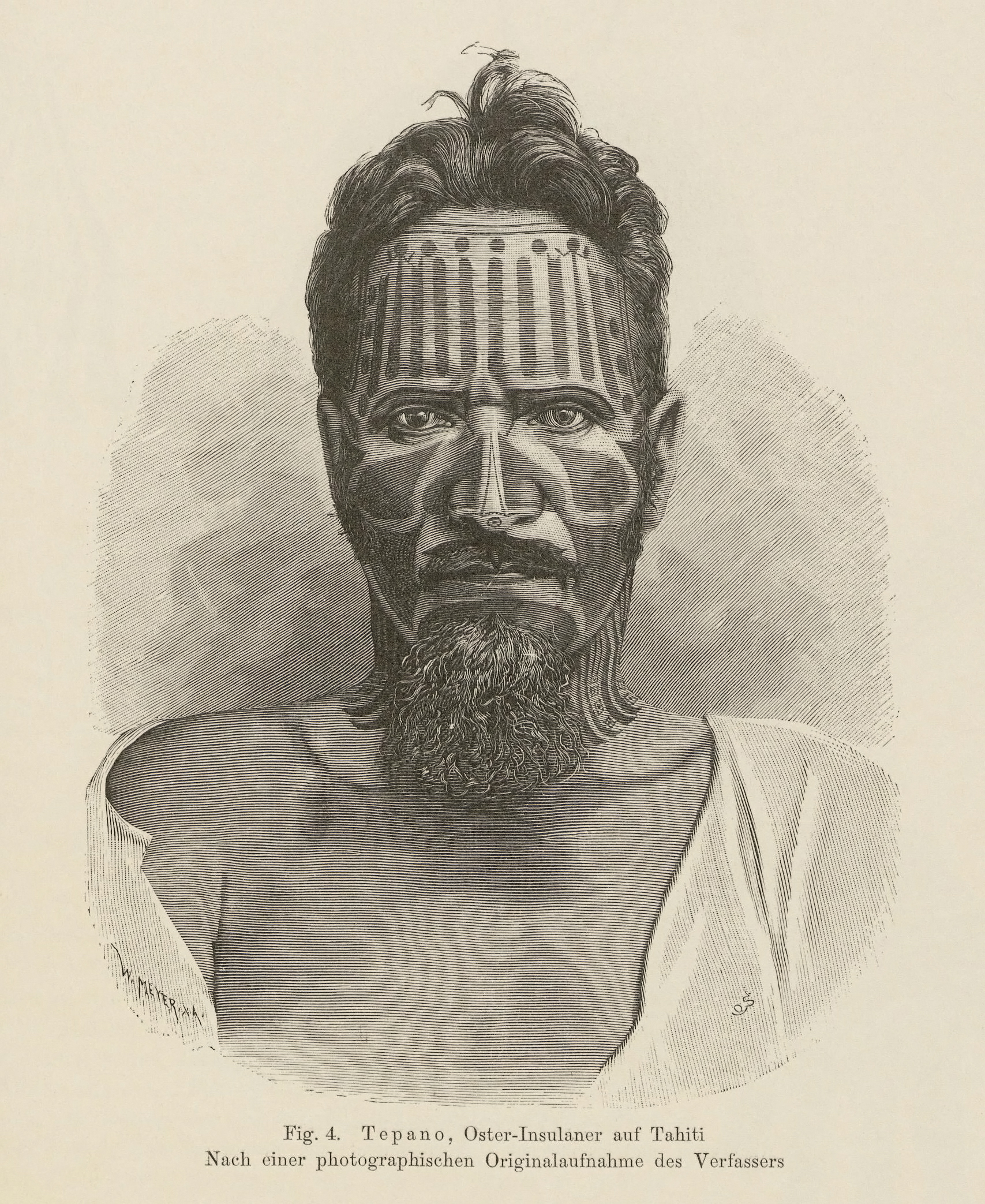
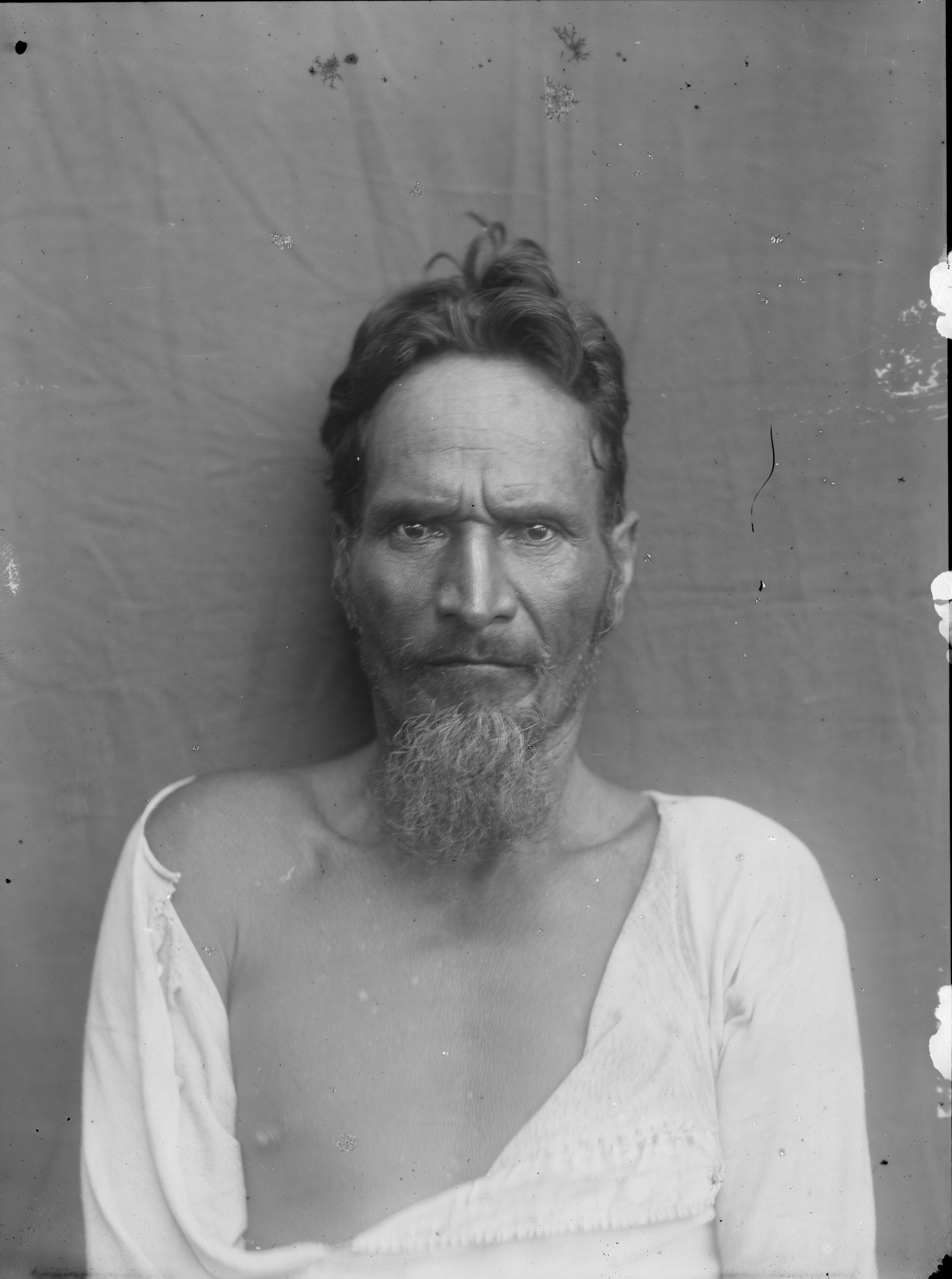
Tepano, a man from Rapa Nui with tattoos on his face. Left picture is photographed in the 1870s by Sophia Hoare in Tahiti. Middle is an engraving after sketches by Hjalmar Stolpe in Tahiti 1884 during the Vanadis expedition, and right is a photo by Oscar Ekholm in 1884. It is very hard to see any traces of the tattoos on the right picture, something Stolpe also writes in his article 1899.

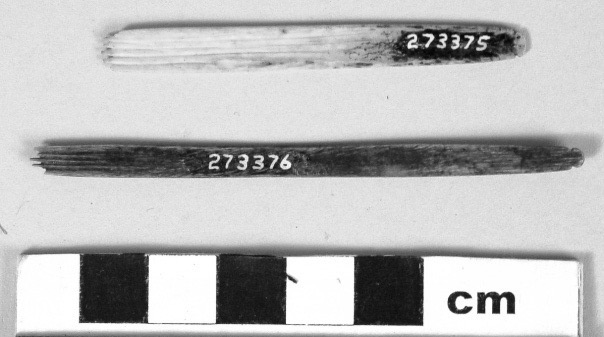
The 2 Iuhi needles donated to the Field Museum from the Fuller collection

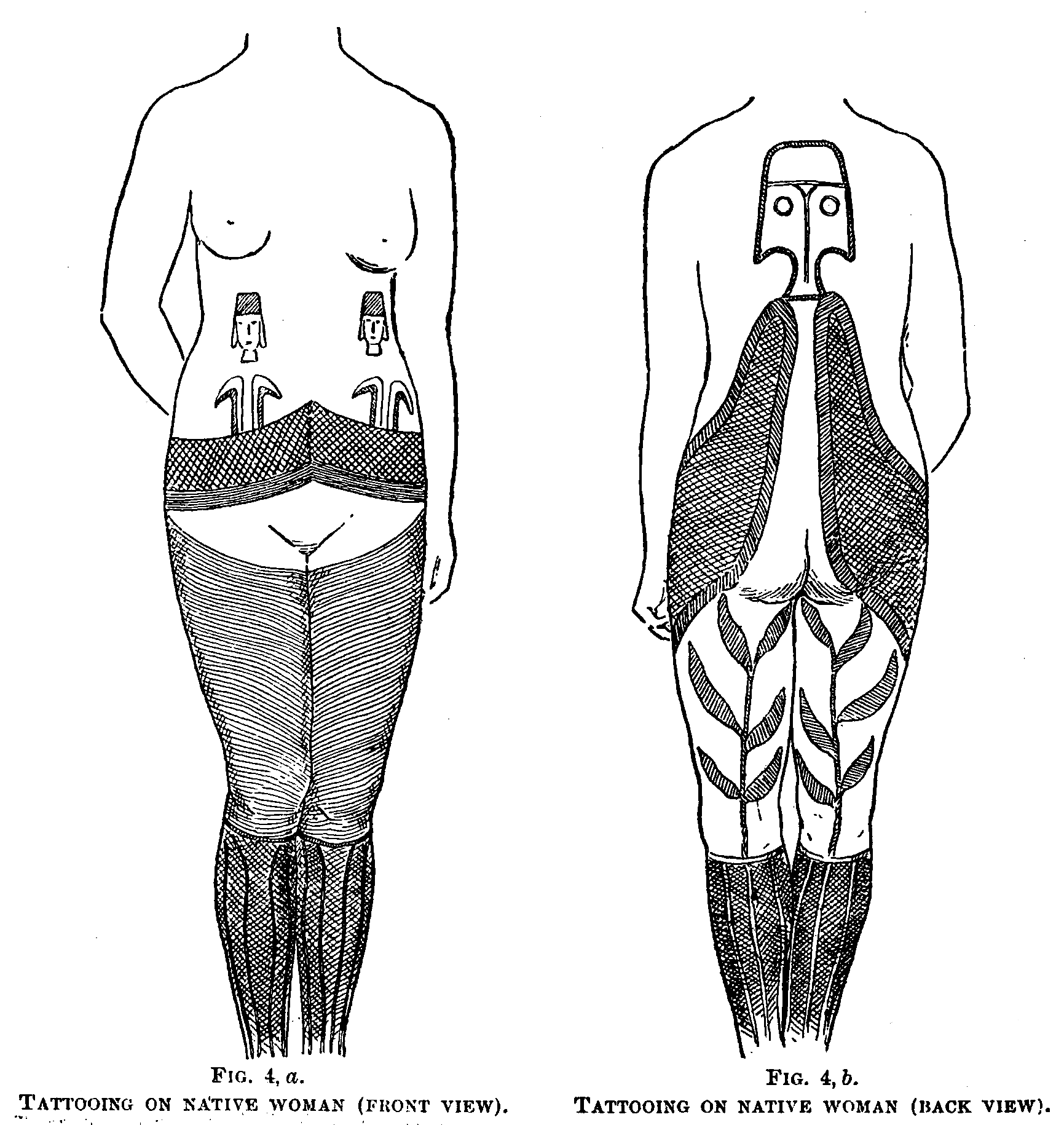
Tattooing on woman, Easter Island, 1886

As in other Polynesian islands, Rapa Nui tattooing had a fundamentally spiritual connotation. (Rapa Nui, Easter Island.) In some cases the tattoos were considered a receptor for divine strength or mana. They were manifestations of the Rapa Nui culture. Priests, warriors and chiefs had more tattoos than the rest of the population, as a symbol of their hierarchy. Both men and women were tattooed to represent their social class.

== Process ==
The tattooing process was performed with bone needles and combs called uhi or iuhi made out of bird or fish bones. The ink was made out of natural products, primarily from the burning of Ti leaves (Cordyline terminalis) and sugar cane. The other end has two grooves so that a rod can be attached to the end, which probably helps the artist maneuver the needles during the tattoo process. Tattoos are applied with the needle combs and a wooden mallet called miro pua ‘uhi.

== Names ==
The tattoos were named based on its location on the body:

- Rima kona: On the back of the hand or wrist.
- Retu: On the forehead.
- Matapea: Under the eyes.
- Pangaha’a: On the cheeks.
- Pare: On the arms.
- Humu: On the thighs and/or calves.
- Tu’u haino ino: On the back and buttocks.

== History ==
=== Design ===
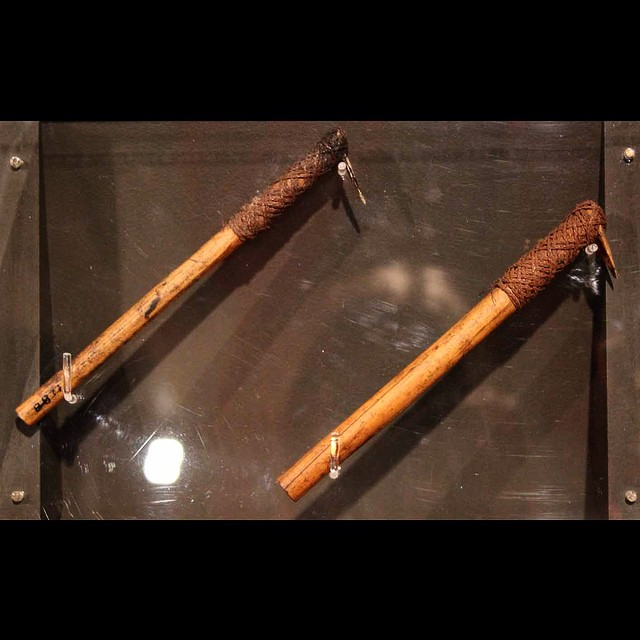
Rapa Nui tattoo tools, Manchester Museum

Tattoos, as well as other forms of art in Rapa Nui, blends anthropomorphic and zoomorphic imagery. The most common symbols represented were of the Make-Make god, Moais, Komari (the symbol of female fertility), the manutara, and other forms of birds, fish, turtles or figures from the Rongo Rongo tablets.

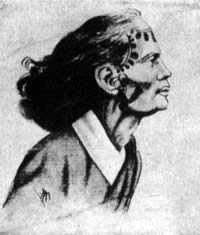
Ana Eva Hei, profile view, 1911

Certain designs were more common than others. Women and men very often had heavy lines on their faces, which, crossing the forehead, extended from one ear to the other. These lines were curved and combined with a series of large dots (humu or puraki, “to enclose”) that marked the forehead and temples. They are also seen on existing barkcloth figures, but in smaller detail. Parallel lines across the forehead and the fringe of dots were the first motifs tattooed on the face. This pattern was the most general, and it was commonly recorded by early voyagers. One of the last women to receive these tattoos was Ana Eva Hei, who was queen consort of Atamu Tekena. Her tattoos were described by Alfred Métraux, Julien Viaud and Walter Knoche.

There are several other tattoo patterns and figures: one woman had an ‘ao, which is a ceremonial paddle, tattooed on her back. Fischer also mentions an old woman with a paddle on her back, but calls it a rapa, which is a dance paddle that was tattooed when she lost her virginity. For her, the paddle reminded her of her first lover. A German marine who visited the island told of “birds and strange beasts” tattoos. Most men and women were covered from head to toe with different patterns and images.

=== Status ===
The tattoos also varied by rank and status. Priests usually had more tattoos to distinguish themselves from the rest, while men and women had tattoos that distinguished their class identity from others.

=== Modern day ===
Nowadays, young people are bringing back Rapa Nui tattoos as an important part of their culture and local artists base their creations on traditional motifs.

== Meaning ==
=== Spiritual ===
Spiritually, tattoos were important because they were considered a gateway to divine strength. Other images included those that represented gods and other spiritual messages.

=== Cultural ===
Sebastian Englert refers to the tattooing, also called Tatú or Tá kona, as a form of natural expression among the islanders, commonly seeing both adults and children with these paintings. "Ta," means to write or engrave and "kona," means place. The whole word means something like "the place to engrave".
