= Krister Malm =

Swedish musicologist

Krister Malm (born 1941) is a Swedish musicologist.

Malm has in his research been engaged in music ethnology and finished his doctorate in 1981 at the University of Gothenburg with a dissertation on the music culture of the Tanzania. From 1973 to 1983, he was head of Stockholm Music Museum and between 1999 and 2005 head of the National Collections of Music. Malm was elected as a member of the Royal Swedish Academy of Music in 1996. He is active in the International Council for Traditional Music, serving as a member of the executive board from 1983 to 1993, vice president from 1995 to 1999, and president from 1999 to 2005. In 2007, he was awarded the Fumio Koizumi Prize for Ethnomusicology.

Malm is best known for his work investigating how local music industries shape music, especially in Big sounds from small peoples: the music industry in small countries, co-written with Roger Wallis.

== Bibliography ==
- Krister Malm; Ulli Heyden (1983). Alla barn är musikanter: rapport från forsknings- och utvecklingsarbete i förskolan 1973-80. Accent (1970), 0280-199X; 9 (in Swedish). Stockholm: Informationsavd., Rikskonserter. LIBRIS 8205093.
- ——; Roger Wallis (1985). The baila of Sri Lanka and the calypso of Trinidad: the mediaization of two kinds of music with topical texts, with special reference to their communicative properties. Rapporter / Musikmuseet, Statens musiksamlingar, 0282-6534; 1985:1. Stockholm: Musikmuseet. LIBRIS 565139.
- —— (1981). Fyra musikkulturer: tradition och förändring i Tanzania, Tunisien, Sverige och Trinidad (in Swedish). Stockholm: AWE/Geber. ISBN 91-20-06094-7. LIBRIS 8347219.
- —— (1981). Fyra musikkulturer: tradition och förändring i Tanzania, Tunisien, Sverige och Trinidad [Four music cultures: tradition and change in Tanzania, Tunisia, Sweden and Trinidad]. Stockholm: AWE/Geber. ISBN 91-20-06094-7. LIBRIS 7219035.
- ——; Roger Wallis (1992). Media policy and music activity. Musikmuseets skrifter, 0282-8952; 23. London: Routledge. ISBN 0-415-05019-7. LIBRIS 4913332.
- ——; Runa Ödlund (1983). Musik i grannskapet på Hertsön: ett forsknings- och utvecklingsarbete med kultur i boendemiljö 1979-83. Rapport från Rikskonserters produktionsgrupp för försöks- verksamhet med social och pedagogisk inriktning, 99-0814650-5; 1983:1 (in Swedish). Stockholm: Rikskonserter. LIBRIS 794225.
- —— (1997). Musik, massmedier och mångfald. Arbetsdokument från Rådet för mångfald inom massmedierna, 1401-0534; 1997:1 (in Swedish). Stockholm: Rådet för mångfald inom massmedierna. LIBRIS 2268092.
- —— (1969). Några metoder vid studiet av kronometriska värden i enstämmig musik (in Swedish). Uppsala: Univ. LIBRIS 2250421.
- ——; Monika Sarstad (1998). Rap, ragga and reggae in Nairobi, Dar es Salaam and Lusaka (in Swedish). Stockholm: Musikmuseet. LIBRIS 2688265.
- ——; Ole Reitov (1993). Six years of cassettes for development: Sorofe 1986-1992. Report / Musikmuseet; 1992:1. Stockholm: Musikmuseet. LIBRIS 1562752.
- —— (1984). Små länder - stor musik (in Swedish). Stockholm: Utbildningsradion. ISBN 91-26-83376-X. LIBRIS 7227595.
- ——; Roger Wallis (1994). Struktur, pengar och musik i massmedierna. Rapport / Musiken år 2002, 99-1573915-X; 10 (in Swedish). Stockholm: Musikaliska akad. LIBRIS 1846176.
- ——; Kay Isacson (1977). Swedish folk music: Schwedische Volksmusik = La musique folklorique suédoise. Stockholm: Rikskonserter. LIBRIS 1943239.
- —— (1973). Turkisk musik (in Swedish). Stockholm: Rikskonserter. LIBRIS 2325616.
- ——; Roger Wallis (1986). What's good for business...: some changes in traditional musics generated by tourism: paper for the ICTM Colloguium on Traditional Music and Tourism, July 9-15, 1986, in Newcastle, Jamaica. Rapporter / Musikmuseet, Statens musiksamlingar, 0282-6534; 1986:3. Stockholm: Musikmus. LIBRIS 609271.
- ——; Roger Wallis (1986). The workings of the phonogram industry. Rapporter / Musikmuseet, Statens musiksamlingar, 0282-6534; 1986:1. Stockholm: Musikmuseet. LIBRIS 1590431.
- ——; Roger Wallis (1984). Big sounds from small peoples: the music industry in small countries. Communication and society, 99-0126495-2. London: Constable. ISBN 0-09-465300-3. LIBRIS 4525738.
- ——; Roger Wallis (1984). Big sounds from small peoples: the music industry in small countries. 99-0407213-2; 2Skrifter från Musikvetenskapliga institutionen, Göteborg, 0348-0879; 7. [New York]: Pendragon Press. ISBN 0-918728-39-8. LIBRIS 6782190.
- ——; Roger Wallis (1983). The music industry in small countries: big sounds from small peoples. Stockholm. LIBRIS 462980.
- ——; Roger Wallis (1983). The music industry in small countries (MISC): big sounds from small peoples. [Gothenburg]: R. Wallis, K. Malm, MISC. LIBRIS 485767.
- ——; Roger Wallis (1985). National identity in a changing world of media technology: some notes from the Music industry in small countries project. Rapporter / Musikmuseet, Statens musiksamlingar, 0282-6534; 1985:2. Stockholm: Musikmus. LIBRIS 585147.
- ——; Roger Wallis (1988). Push-pull for the video clip: a systems approach to understanding the relationship between the music industry and music television. Rapporter / Musikmuseet, Statens musiksamlingar, 0282-6534; 1988:1. Stockholm: Musikmuseet. LIBRIS 1920453.
