= Izaly Zemtsovsky =

Russian ethnomusicologist (born 1936)

- Born: February 22, 1936 (age 90); St Petersburg, Russia
- Education: Leningrad Conservatory
- Known for: The notions of Melosphere and Homo musicus
- Awards: Fumio Koizumi Prize for ethnomusicology (2011)
- Scientific career
- Fields: Ethnomusicology,
- Workplaces: Stanford University

Izaly Iosifovich Zemtsovsky (Russian: Изалий Иосифович Земцовский; born February 22, 1936) is a Russian-born American ethnomusicologist. He is a visiting professor at Stanford University. Zemtsovsky is known in ethnomusicology for his wide range of subjects of study, including the theory of melodic formulas, rhythmic formulas, comparative research of various regions of the world, study of musical universals and the importance of musical data in ethno-genetic reconstructions.

== Biography ==
Zemtsovsky graduated from Leningrad Conservatory with degrees in ethnomusicology and composition, and graduated Leningrad University as a folklorist and linguist.

In the 1970s-1990s, Zemtsovsky was widely regarded as a key figure of Russian (and Soviet) ethnomusicology. As a prolific teacher (for several decades he was a professor at the Leningrad State Institute of Theatre, Music and Cinema), he affected the formation of Russian and other ethnic schools of musicologists in former Soviet Union (including Baltic, Caucasian, and Central Asian republics, from the 1990s – independent states) and countries of the Eastern Europe. He has lived in the US since 1994, teaching first at UCLA, then at the University of Wisconsin at Madison, Wisconsin, Berkeley, and now at Stanford University. He maintains professional contacts with Russia.

From 2006, Zemtsovsky is the director (and founder) of Silk Road House, a non-profit organization focused on the culture of the Silk Road, in Berkeley, California.

Zemtsovsky is married to Alma Kunanbaeva, a Kazakh ethnomusicologist.

Zemtsovsky is the author of over 20 books and over 500 articles on numerous European and Asian languages.

Zemtsovsky proposed the notions of "melosphere", "Homo musicus", a new scholarly discipline, "ethnogeomusicology", and a new research approach, a "historical morphology of the folk song". Zemtsovsky has been a lifelong advocate of Russian Soviet musicologist Boris Asafiev's "intonation theory" and contributed to its use at European and American universities.

In 2011 in recognition of his research activity and prolific teaching Zemtsovsky was awarded the Fumio Koizumi Prize for ethnomusicology.

== Selected Publications ==
- Zemtsovsky, Izaly (2002). "Polyphony as a Way of Creating and Thinking: The Musical Identity of Homo Polyphonicus". The World of Music. 44 (2): 15–30.

== See also ==
- Russian Music
