= Maurice Clare (violinist) =

Scottish violinist (1914–1987)

- Born: 10 December 1914; Dundee, Scotland
- Died: 22 December 1987 (aged 73); London
- Occupation: Classical violinist
- Years active: 1931-1965
- Known for: Developing New Zealand's professional orchestras

Maurice Clare (10 December 1914 - 22 December 1987) was a Scottish violinist, who in 1939 helped launch New Zealand's National String Orchestra, run by the National Broadcasting Service, and the forerunner of the New Zealand Symphony Orchestra. As a violin soloist he played for a number of orchestras in the UK, including the London Philharmonic Orchestra, of which he was the acting lead at the age of 21. In 1947 he led the Boyd Neel Orchestra. During the 1950s he and his wife, the pianist and harpsichord player Marta Zalan, toured India, Singapore, Australia and New Zealand.

== Early years ==
Clare was born in 1914 in Dundee, Scotland to English parents, his father was also a professional musician. In 1929, while still a teenager, Clare went to Prague to study under Otakar Ševčík. In 1931 he went to Berlin and then Paris to study under Carl Flesch and Georges Enesco respectively, having been awarded a three year travelling scholarship by the Caird Trust.

== Prewar career ==
At the age of 21, Clare was appointed the acting lead of the London Philharmonic Orchestra. Sir Thomas Beecham, the orchestra's founder, was still the conductor. He also played for the Scottish Orchestra (now the Royal Scottish National Orchestra} and the Hallé Orchestra. In 1938 Clare was offered a position with New Zealand's National Broadcasting Service, where he founded one of the country's first professional orchestras in 1939. The current New Zealand Symphony Orchestra is descended from Clare's original string orchestra. During World War II he became part of New Zealand's armed services.

== After the war ==
Clare returned to Britain after the War, and helped to set up the Wigmore Ensemble, a chamber group. In 1947 he was appointed leader of The Boyd Neel String Orchestra, a position that he held until 1953. From then on Clare, along with his wife, pianist Marta Zalan, spent much of the next twelve years overseas, touring India, Japan, Australia, New Zealand, Singapore among other places. Some of these touring concerts were sponsored by the British Council. In 1956 he spent one year with the Sydney Symphony Orchestra, before spending a year with the Swedish Radio Orchestra. In 1960 he was appointed Concert Master of the Victoria Symphony Orchestra, Melbourne.

== Return to Britain ==
In 1965 Clare returned to England, founding the Camerata String Orchestra, and teaching at the Royal Northern College of Music, and Chetham's School of Music. Whilst in Australia Clare had expressed the desire to move from touring to teaching.

== Repertoire ==
Clare favoured a wide range of composers, some of whom were not widely popular at the time. He enjoyed Johann Sebastian Bach's Solo Sonatas, the Béla Bartók Sonatas, Dmitri Shostakovich, Frank Martin, Franz Schubert, along with some of Wolfgang Amadeus Mozart's and Ludwig van Beethoven's works.

== Death ==
Clare died in London on 22 December 1987.

== Instruments ==
Clare's violins included a 1737 Giuseppe Guarneri. In November 2021 instruments from Clare and his wife were auctioned, with an 1820 Richard Tobin selling for £10,200. A baroque bow, attributed to Antonio Stradivari, sold for £14,400.

== Recordings ==
Some of Clare's recordings remain available. This includes Maurice Clare Rediscovered, released by Nimbus in 2026. The original recordings, of Georg Philipp Telemann's Fantasias, were made in Birmingham in August 1974.
