= International Council for Traditional Music =

Non governmental music organization

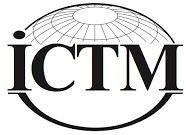
- ICTM
- Abbreviation: ICTM
- Formation: 22 September 1947
- Type: INGO
- Region served: Worldwide
- Official language: English
- President: Svanibor Pettan
- Parent organization: UNESCO
- Website: www.ictmusic.org

The International Council for Traditional Music (ICTM) is a scholarly non-governmental organization which focuses on the study, practice, documentation, preservation, and dissemination of traditional music and dance of all countries. Founded in London on September 22, 1947, it publishes the Yearbook for Traditional Music once a year and the Bulletin of the ICTM three times a year. The organization was previously known as The International Folk Music Council (IFMC). In 1949, it helped found the UNESCO International Music Council and remains a non-governmental organization in formal consultative relations with UNESCO.

As a non-governmental organization in formal consultative relations with UNESCO and by means of its wide international representation and the activities of its Study Groups, the International Council for Traditional Music acts as a bond among peoples of different cultures and thus contributes to the peace of humankind.

== Conferences ==
ICTM conferences have been held since 1948 and are presently biennial. In 2009, the site of the ICTM World Conference was Durban, South Africa, in 2011 it was St. John's Newfoundland, in 2013 Shanghai, China, in 2015 Astana, Kazakhstan, in 2017 Limerick, Ireland, and in 2019 it was in Bangkok, Thailand. The 2021 conference was postponed until July 2022 due to the COVID-19 pandemic.

The 47th ICTM World Conference was held between July 13, 2023 and July 19, 2023 at the ultra-modern Cedi Conference Center University of Ghana, Legon.

#	Conf.	Time	Location	Host institution
47	ICTM	13–27 July 2023	Legon Accra Ghana	The Cedi Conference Center, University of Ghana, Legon
46	ICTM	21–27 July 2022	Lisbon Portugal	NOVA School of Social Sciences and Humanities, New University of Lisbon (NOVA-FCSH)
45	ICTM	11–17 July 2019	Bangkok Thailand	Chulalongkorn University
44	ICTM	13–19 July 2017	Limerick Ireland	Irish World Academy of Music and Dance, University of Limerick
43	ICTM	16–22 July 2015	Astana Kazakhstan	Kazakh National University of Arts
42	ICTM	11–17 July 2013	Shanghai China	Shanghai Conservatory of Music
41	ICTM	13–19 July 2011	St. John's Canada	Memorial University of Newfoundland
40	ICTM	1–8 July 2009	Durban South Africa	University of KwaZulu-Natal
39	ICTM	4–11 July 2007	Vienna Austria	Austria ICTM National Committee and the University of Music and Performing Arts Vienna, in partnership with the Institute of Musicology at Vienna University, the Phonogrammarchiv of the Austrian Academy of Sciences, and the Austrian Commission for UNESCO
38	ICTM	3–10 August 2005	Sheffield United Kingdom	University of Sheffield
37	ICTM	4–11 January 2004	Fuzhou & Quanzhou; China	Fujian Normal University & Quanzhou Normal University
36	ICTM	4–11 July 2001	Rio de Janeiro Brazil	School of Music, Universidade Federal do Rio de Janeiro (UFRJ), Universidade do Rio de Janeiro (UNIRIO), Universidade Estadual do Rio de Janeiro (UERJ), and Conservatório Brasileiro de Música (CBM)
35	ICTM	19–25 August 1999	Hiroshima Japan	ICTM National Committee for Japan, The Society for Research in Asiatic Music, Tôyô Ongaku Gakkai, in cooperation with Hiroshima City University, Hiroshima University, and the Elizabeth Music College
34	ICTM	25 June – 1 July 1997	Nitra Slovakia	Institute of Musicology of the Slovak Academy of Sciences Bratislava
33	ICTM	5–11 January 1995	Canberra Australia	Canberra School of Music, Australian National University
32	ICTM	16–22 June 1993	Berlin Germany	International Institute for Traditional Music
31	ICTM	3–9 July 1991	Kowloon Hong Kong	
30	ICTM	23–30 July 1989	Schladming Austria	
29	ICTM	30 July – 6 August 1987	Berlin East Germany	
28	ICTM	30 July – 7 August 1985	Stockholm Sweden & Helsinki Finland	
27	ICTM	8–15 August 1983	New York United States	Columbia University
26	IFMC	25 August – 1 September 1981	Seoul Korea	
25	IFMC	28 July – 4 August 1979	Oslo Norway	
24	IFMC	13–18 August 1977	Honolulu United States	University of Hawaii at Manoa
23	IFMC	14–21 August 1975	Regensburg Germany	University of Regensburg
22	IFMC	26 July – 1 August 1973	Bayonne France	
21	IFMC	27 August – 3 September 1971	Kingston Jamaica	
20	IFMC	6–13 August 1969	Edinburgh United Kingdom	
19	IFMC	28 July – 3 August 1967	Ostend Belgium	
18	IFMC	26 July – 3 August 1966	Legon Accra Ghana	
17	IFMC	17–25 August 1964	Budapest Hungary	
16	IFMC	5–9 August 1963	Jerusalem Israel	
15	IFMC	13–21 July 1962	Gottwaldov Czechoslovakia, now Zlín Czech Republic	
14	IFMC	28 Aug – 3 September 1961	Québec Canada	
13	IFMC	24–29 July 1960	Vienna Austria	
12	IFMC	11–17 August 1959	Sinaia & Bucharest Romania	
11	IFMC	28 Jul – 3 August 1958	Liège Belgium	
10	IFMC	22–27 August 1957	Copenhagen Denmark	
9	IFMC	25–31 July 1956	Trossingen & Stuttgart; Germany	
8	IFMC	29 June – 5 July 1955	Oslo Norway	
7	IFMC	16–22 August 1954	São Paulo Brazil	
6	IFMC	9–15 July 1953	Biarritz France & Pamplona Spain	
5	IFMC	14–19 July 1952	London United Kingdom	
4	IFMC	8–14 September 1951	Opatija Yugoslavia	Unions of Societies for Culture and Education of Yugoslavia.
3	IFMC	17–21 July 1950	Bloomington United States	
2	IFMC	7–11 September 1949	Venice Italy	Ente Nazionale Assistenza Lavoratori — Comitato Italiano Arti e Tradizioni Popolari
1	IFMC	13–18 September 1948	Basel Switzerland	Société Suisse des Traditions Populaires and the Fédération des Costumes Suisses

== Publications ==
- Yearbook for Traditional Music (originally known as the Journal of the International Folk Music Council from 1949–1958)
- Bulletin of the ICTM (originally known as Bulletin of the IFMC)

== World Network ==
The Council is represented by individuals, called Liaison Officers, and representatives of organisations, called National and Regional Committees. They all act as links between the Council and the community of individuals and organizations involved with traditional music and dance in their country or region.

As of January 2019, the International Council for Traditional Music is officially represented in 129 countries or regions.

== Presidents ==
- Svanibor Pettan (2021–2025)
- Salwa El-Shawan Castelo-Branco (2013–2021)
- Adrienne L. Kaeppler (2005–2013)
- Krister Malm (1999–2005)
- Anthony Seeger (1997–1999)
- Erich Stockmann (1982–1997)
- Poul Rovsing Olsen (1977–1982)
- Klaus P. Wachsmann (1973–1977)
- Willard Rhodes (1967–1973)
- Maud Karpeles, Honorary President (1963–1976)
- Zoltán Kodály (1961–1967)
- Jaap Kunst (1959–1960)
- Ralph Vaughan Williams (1947–1958)
