= Alfred Métraux =

Swiss anthropologist (1902–1963)

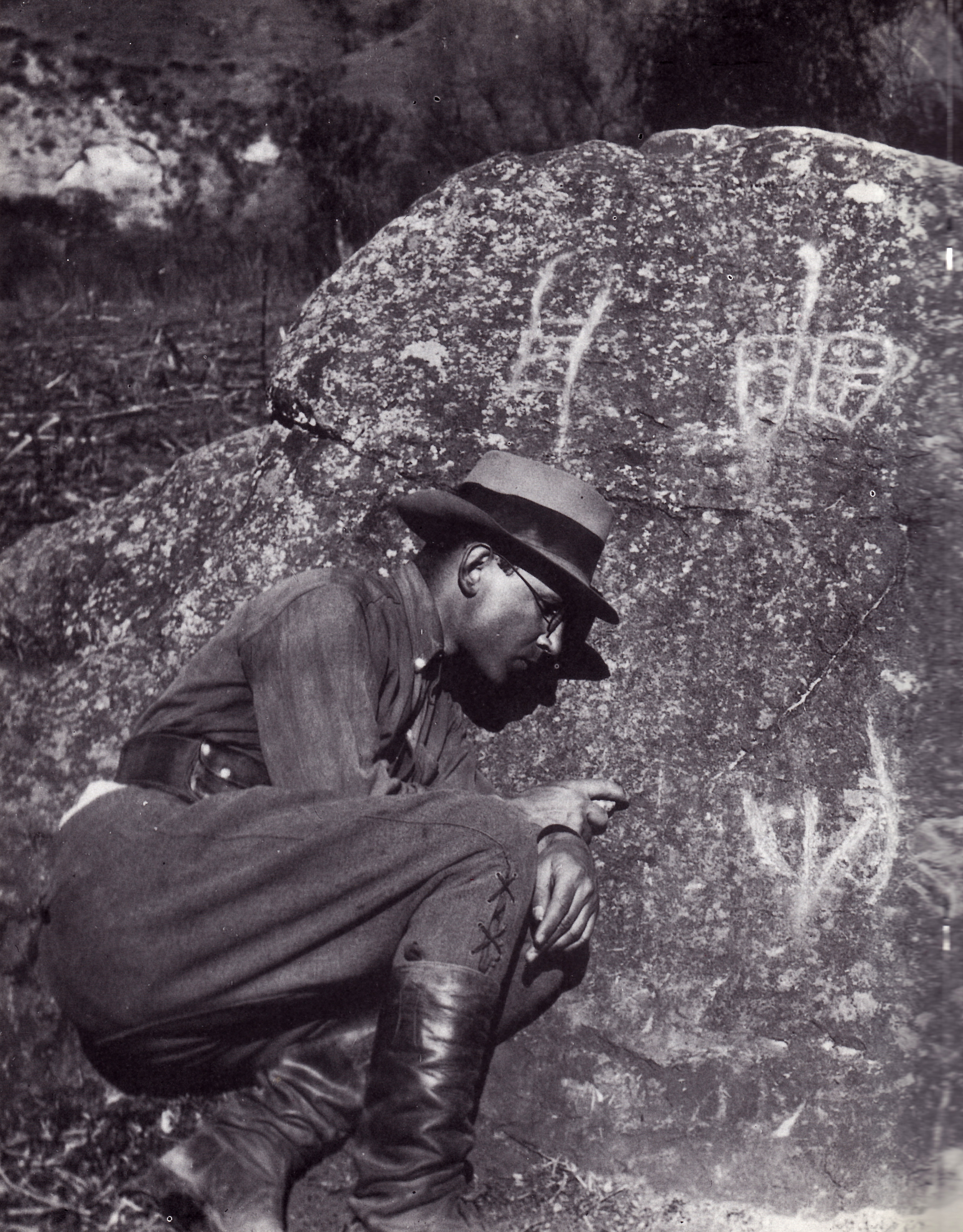
- Alfred Métraux, 1932
- Born: 5 November 1902; Lausanne, Switzerland
- Died: 12 April 1963 (aged 60); Paris, France
- Scientific career
- Fields: Ethnography

Alfred Métraux (French pronunciation: [alfʁɛd metʁo]; 5 November 1902 – 12 April 1963) was a Swiss-Argentine anthropologist, ethnologist and human rights leader.

Métraux was praised by fellow anthropologist Claude Lévi-Strauss: "To begin with, it was Métraux who always took ethnography seriously, who tirelessly protected our science, and the Indians themselves, from the sometimes dangerous fantasies of the esthetes and the theoreticians."

== Early life ==
Born in Lausanne, Switzerland, Métraux spent much of his childhood in Argentina where his father was a well-known surgeon resident in Mendoza. His mother was a Georgian from Tbilisi. He received his secondary and university education in Europe, at the Classical Gymnasium of Lausanne, the École nationale des chartes in Paris, the École nationale des langues Orientales (Diplome, 1925). The École pratique des hautes études (Diplôme, 1927) and the Sorbonne (Docteur ès lettres, 1928). He also studied in Sweden, in Gothenburg's University and did research at the well-equipped local anthropological museum.

Among his teachers were Marcel Mauss, Paul Rivet, and Erland Nordenskiöld. While he was still a student he entered into correspondence with Father John Cooper who introduced him to the American school of cultural anthropology. It is said that Father Cooper did not realize at first that his scholarly correspondent was only 19 and 20 years old. They actually met much later, when Métraux came to the United States; but Father Cooper seems to have had considerable influence on Alfred Métraux's thought. Métraux combined in his work the best of both the European and the American tradition of historical anthropology.

== Early career ==
Métraux's professional career was equally cosmopolitan. His interest for anthropology and original languages, began early in his life when his father a medical doctor took an overseas appointment, relocating his family from Lausanne Switzerland to Mendoza Argentina. During his research years in Argentina, his work was centred in the study and interpretation of native languages, allowing him to create an extensive record of Argentine native ethnic groups, including: Calchaquí, Guaraní, Chiriguano, Toba & Wichís, and the Uros-Chipaya. While working on this research, he was invited to collaborate in the writing of the Handbook of South American Indians. Eventually, he founded and became the first director (1928 – 1934) of the Institute of Ethnology at the University of Tucuman, in Argentina. During this period, he also published an article for the Universidad Nacional De la Plata Museo of Argentina called "Mitos y cuentos de los Indios Chiriguano" Myths and Stories of the Chiriguano Indians.

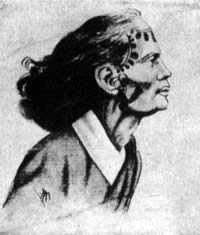
Ana Eva Hei by Walter Knoche, 1911

In 1934–35, he led a French expedition to Easter Island, publishing an ethnology of the indigenous people of the island. This included a description of one the last women to receive traditional facial tattoos, Ana Eva Hei.

In 1936–38, he was a Fellow of the Bishop Museum in Honolulu. In 1939, he returned to Argentina and Bolivia for field research on a Guggenheim Fellowship. In 1940, upon his return to the United States from South America, he was in residence at Yale University with a renewal of his Guggenheim Fellowship. That next year, he worked with the Cross Cultural Survey (now the Human Relations Area Files) on South American data and was associated with such people as John Dollard, Leonard Bloomfield, and others of the Institute of Human Relations.

In 1941, he joined the staff of the Bureau of American Ethnology of the Smithsonian Institution. There, from 1941 to 1945, he played an important role in producing the monumental Handbook of South American Indians. Perhaps no other writer contributed as many pages to this work. As the editor, Julian Steward, acknowledges, "The extent of his (Métraux's) contribution is by no means indicated by the large number of articles appearing under his name. With an unsurpassed knowledge of South American ethnology and ever generous of his time, his advice and help to the editor and contributors alike have been a major factor in the successful completion of the work." (Vol. I, p. 9). In addition, Métraux taught briefly at University of California, Berkeley (1938), the Escuela Nacional de Antropología, Mexico (1943), the Colegio de Mexico (1943), and the Faculdad Latino-Americana de Ciencias Sociales, Santiago, Chile (1959–60).

== UNESCO ==
In the early spring of 1945, Métraux went to Europe as a member of the United States Bombing Survey and he saw the physical and moral desolation of Europe. Although he had by then become a citizen of the United States, this experience seems to have reaffirmed, in a way, his traditional ties with Europe. It also strengthened his belief in the necessity for European unity and for the need of a firm basis for international, inter-cultural, and inter-racial understanding. His early view of war devastated Europe was important in his decision in 1946 to take a post on the secretariat of the United Nations. Thus, from 1946 until 1962, he worked for his ideals of international and inter-cultural understanding within the framework of international organization with only occasional excursions into academic life and into anthropological field research. In 1946 and 1947, he was a member of the Department of Social Affairs of the United Nations, but in 1947 he was assigned to UNESCO, and finally, in 1950, he became a permanent member of UNESCO's Department of Social Science. As an international civil servant, he served the world and his profession well. He took part in the Hylean Amazon project in 1947–1948, led the UNESCO Marbial Valley (Haiti) anthropological survey from 1948 to 1950 with personnel from the international Labor Office, and studied the internal migrations of the Aymara and Quechua Indians in Peru and Bolivia (1954). He edited the series of pamphlets on The Race Question and Modern Thought and The Race Question and Modern Science, published by UNESCO since 1950. He also organized the research that led to a series of volumes on race relations in Brazil, such as "As relações raciais entre negros a brancos em São Paulo," edited by Roger Bastide and Florestan Fernandes (São Paulo, 1955), Race and Class in Rural Brazil, edited by Charles Wagley (UNESCO, Paris, 1952), and others. At UNESCO, he was responsible for the participation of anthropologists in many important projects around the world, and he consistently emphasized the anthropological point of view in all of the many programs with which he was associated. Anthropology lost not only a productive scholar, but an effective translator of anthropological theory and knowledge into action.

== Ethnography ==
Métraux valued field ethnography more than theory. He let the facts speak for themselves, and many of his facts modified anthropological theory. Yet, one felt that he was too restless and too eager to be on his way to produce detailed and lengthy field reports such as those of Curt Nimuendajú on the Brazilian Gê. He was a sensitive field worker with many years of experience, and his articles on the Argentine Chaco and his book on Haitian Vodun indicate that he gathered careful and objective data in the field. He liked to think of himself as a field ethnologist. Any evening with him led to stories of nights around a fire with Argentine gauchos, his last stay with the semi-pacified Kayapo of Brazil, his period of residence on Easter Island, a Haitian voodoo ceremony, or a Candomblé ceremony in Bahia which he had attended with his friend Pierre Verger.

== Accomplishments ==
Métraux published landmark studies of South American Indians including the Incas, Haitian voodoo and the ancient cultures of Easter Island. He participated in the framing of the United Nations Universal Declaration of Human Rights and later as director of the Dept. of Social Sciences at UNESCO, he presided over a series of studies which resulted in several publications aiming to prove the absence of scientific foundation to theories of racial superiority. The 1951 UNESCO Statement on the Nature of Race and Race Differences enshrined these findings. A dedicated anthropologist and humanitarian, he brought the brilliance of South American Indian cultures to light, solved the mysteries of Easter Island, taught the world about Voodoo, and defined the United Nations' stand against racism. His books include Voodoo, The History of the Incas and Easter Island.

At the time of his death, he was Professor of South American Anthropology at the École Pratique des Hautes Études, Paris.

== Personal life ==
Métraux was married three times. Each of his wives was in a different way a scientific collaborator. His first wife, Eva Spiro Métraux, translated anthropological materials from English to French. His second wife, Rhoda Bubendey Métraux did research with him in Mexico, Argentina, and Haiti and was a well known anthropologist. He also married Fernande Schulmann who accompanied him to Chile, Peru, and Brazil and who planned to work with him in Paraguay.

Métraux committed suicide by an overdose of barbiturates. On 20 April 1963, his corpse was discovered near the Chateaux de la Madeleine in the Vallee de Chevreuse about 30 km outside of Paris.

He was survived also by his brother, Guy Métraux (1919-2000) of Paris, his sister, Vera Conne (1920-2009) of Lausanne, and by two sons: Eric Métraux (1927–92) from his first marriage, and Daniel Alfred Métraux (born 1948), the son of Rhoda Métraux.
