= Charles Phillips (archaeologist) =

British archaeologist (1901–1985)

- Born: Charles William Phillips; 24 April 1901; England
- Died: 23 September 1985 (aged 84)
- Known for: Leader of the Sutton Hoo ship-burial excavation, 1939
- Spouse: Margaret Mann Phillips
- Awards: Victoria Medal, 1967
- Scientific career
- Fields: Archaeology

Charles William Phillips OBE FSA (24 April 1901 – 23 September 1985) was a British archaeologist best known for leading the 1939 excavation of the Sutton Hoo burial ship, an intact collection of Anglo-Saxon grave-goods. In 1946, he replaced O. G. S. Crawford as the Archaeology Officer of the Ordnance Survey. He was awarded the Victoria Medal of the Royal Geographical Society in 1967 for his contributions to the topography and mapping of Early Britain.

== Early life and education ==
Charles Phillips was born on 24 April 1901, the son of Harold and Mary Elizabeth. His parents had met in London and were married on 14 October 1899. Harold Phillips had started to suffer from depression around 1893, and despite a number of "crises" during the short engagement, as Charles Phillips would later describe them, apparently no efforts were made to apprise his fiancée's family of his condition; nevertheless, none of her relatives showed up for the wedding. The couple had two sons and a daughter, with Charles being the oldest. Despite attempts at therapy, Harold Phillips killed himself on 30 January 1907.

For about a year, Charles Phillips was sent to live with his mother's parents in Ardington, after which he moved back in with his mother in Henley-on-Thames. There he attended Henley Grammar school, which he termed "a rather difficult time at the rather decayed" school; once his mother obtained a diploma in dairying from Reading University and moved to tend to the dairy at Arundel Castle, he lodged with an old friend of his father, visiting his family for the holidays.

From 1909 to 1910 Phillips was educated at Littlehampton Commercial School, his tuition paid for by the Freemasons of which his father had been a member, and by their graces he was installed in the Royal Masonic School for Boys in Bushey, Hertfordshire, in January 1911. Phillips was the only new boy assigned to his junior house. He characterised the headmaster of the other as a "sadist" who was forced out two years later due to a "scandal." His own time at the school lasted until 1919. This included a stint at Stonehenge at the end of World War I, when a shortage of workers necessitated the use of older schoolboys to take in the harvest nearby. His time digging potatoes was short, for twenty-eight of the thirty schoolboys came down with diarrhoea. Phillips was not affected, and together with the other well schoolboy and an Army cook, spent days digging latrines. While home for the Christmas holiday that year, Phillips spent time exploring Burgh Castle, collecting pieces of Romano-British pottery that were placed in the school library.

On leaving school the following term, he was an awarded an exhibition to study history at Selwyn College, Cambridge. He was awarded a first in part I of the Tripos in 1921 and a second class (division one) in part II in 1922. He was also awarded a third class in Law in 1922.

== Career ==
In the 1929/1930 academic year, Phillips became the librarian of Selwyn College. He was elected Fellow of Selwyn College in 1933, and taught the college's history students in addition to his librarian work. He temporarily stepped down as librarian in 1940 to serve in the Royal Air Force during the Second World War. He ended his librarianship in 1945, and resigned his fellowship in 1947.

In 1945 or 1946, Phillips was chosen to succeed O. G. S. Crawford as archaeology officer of the Ordnance Survey. He took up the appointment in early 1947, and retired in 1965.

=== Contribution to Lincolnshire archaeology ===
Phillips made an important contribution to the study of archaeology in Lincolnshire, a previously neglected county. This work was started in 1929 under the influence of O G S Crawford on behalf of the Ordnance Survey and involved completing a record of all previous archaeological discoveries in the county, published in his two articles on The Present State of Archaeology in Lincolnshire. He also surveyed the long barrows of the county. This work culminated in his excavation of the Skendleby long barrow in the Lincolnshire Wolds, which was published in 1936 in Archaeologia. Further research was published in Roman Fenland which he edited in 1970.

=== Sutton Hoo ===
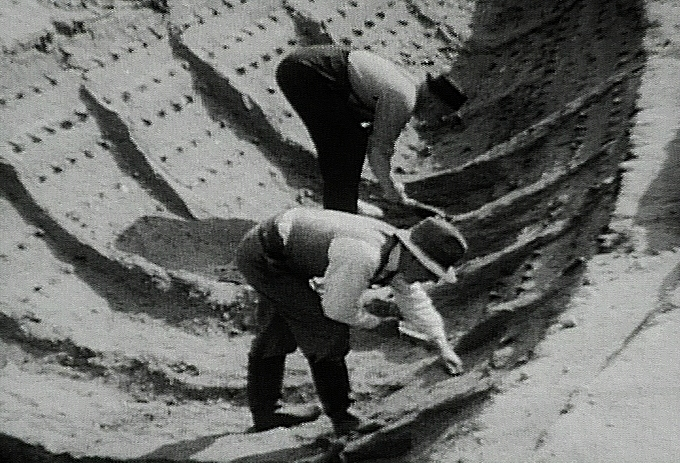
The 1939 excavation of the Sutton Hoo burial ship

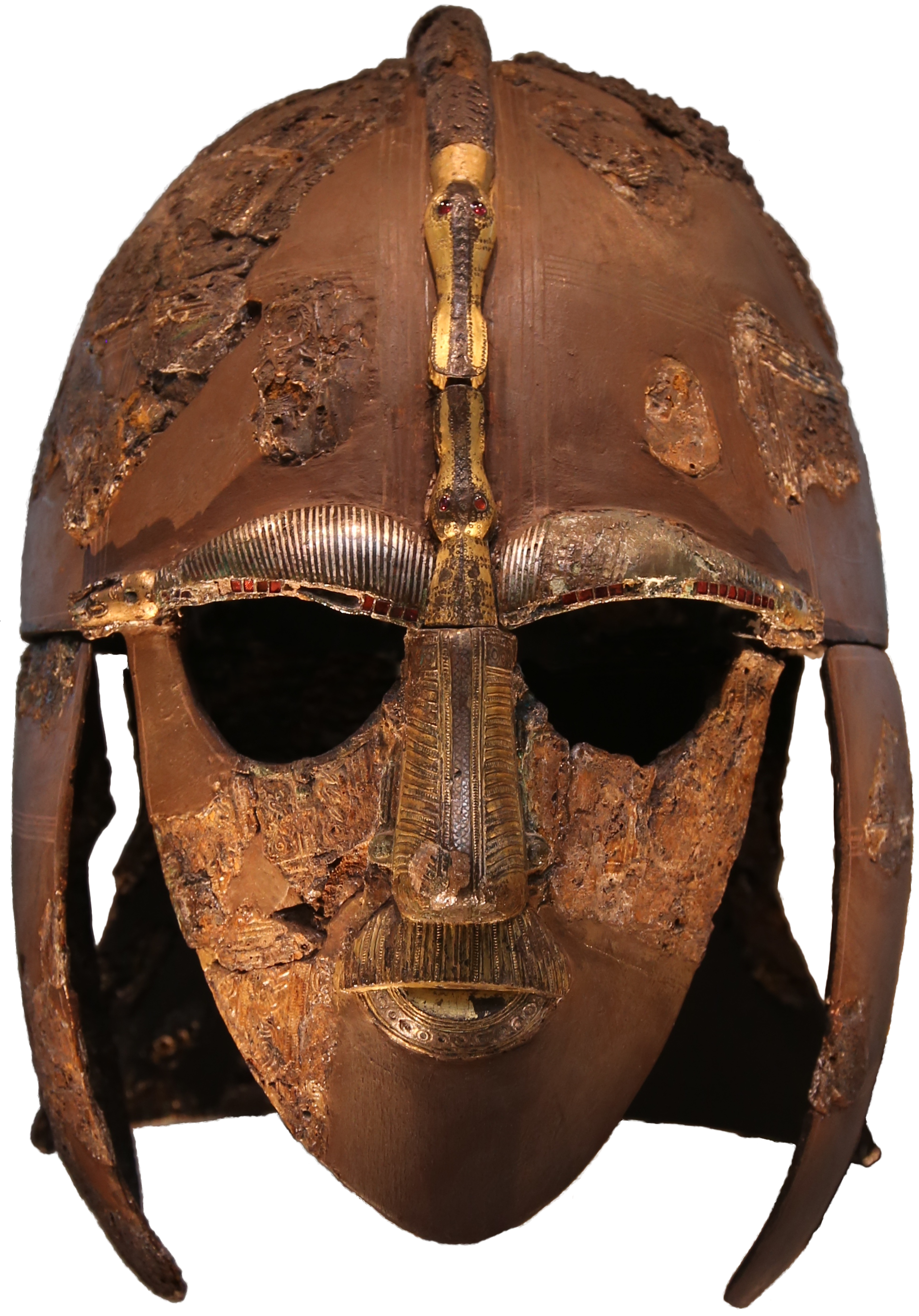
The Sutton Hoo helmet is the most iconic find from its namesake ship-burial

Phillips was in charge of the excavation of the Sutton Hoo ship-burial, widely considered the grave of the Anglo-Saxon king Rædwald of East Anglia, from 10 July to 25 August 1939. Excavation of a large burial mound had begun in early May under the leadership of Basil Brown, who the previous year had opened several smaller mounds nearby. On 11 May, the remainder of an iron ship rivet was found, and seven days later Guy Maynard, the then curator of Ipswich Museum, was informed of the "indications of a large vessel" remaining in the soil. Phillips, then a fellow at Selwyn College and working on excavations at Little Woodbury, was alerted to the discovery by Maynard; visiting the site on 6 June, Phillips said "it could be the ship of a King". Due to his experience with excavations, the Sutton Hoo ship-burial was put under his command. With the ship cleared but for the burial chamber, he arrived at Sutton Hoo on 8 July, and began work two days later.

=== Military service ===
During the Second World War, Phillips served in the Royal Air Force in the Central Airphotographic Interpretation Unit and the Directorate of Military Survey. He was commissioned into the RAF as a pilot officer on probation on 26 May 1941. On 26 May 1942, his commission was confirmed and he was promoted to the war substantive rank of flying officer. He relinquished his commission in 1954, and was granted permission to retain the rank of flight lieutenant.

== Awards and honours ==
He was awarded the Victoria Medal of the Royal Geographical Society in 1967 for his contributions to the topography and mapping of Early Britain. He was an elected Fellow of the Society of Antiquaries of London (FSA).

== Personal life ==
On 3 July 1940, Phillips married Margaret Mann Phillips, an Erasmus scholar. Together, they had a son and a daughter.

== In media ==
In the 2021 film The Dig, which tells the story of the Sutton Hoo excavations, Phillips (aged 38 in 1939) was played by actor Ken Stott (aged 67 when the film was made), who misleadingly played Phillips as an elderly curmudgeon.

== Publications ==
- Phillips, Charles W. (April 1940). "The Excavation of the Sutton Hoo Ship-burial". The Antiquaries Journal. XX (2). Society of Antiquaries of London: 149–202. doi:10.1017/S0003581500009677.
- Phillips, Charles W. (October 1940). "The Sutton Hoo Burial Ship". The Mariner's Mirror. XXVI (4). Society for Nautical Research: 345–355. doi:10.1080/00253359.1940.10657405.
- Phillips, Charles W. (February 1941). "Ancestor of the British Navy". National Geographic. LXXIX (2). The National Geographic Society: 247–268.
- Phillips, Charles W. (October 1946). "The World from Sutton Hoo". The Geographical Magazine. XIX (6). Royal Geographical Society: 235–343.
- Phillips, Charles W. (1956). "The Excavation of the Sutton Hoo Ship-Burial". In Bruce-Mitford, Rupert (ed.). Recent Archaeological Excavations in Britain: Selected Excavations 1939–1955 with a Chapter on Recent Air-Reconnaissance. New York: Macmillan. pp. 145–166.
- Phillips, Charles W. (1970). "Forward". In Grohskopf, Bernice (ed.). The Treasure of Sutton Hoo. New York: Atheneum. pp. xi–xiv.
- Phillips, Charles W. (1987). My Life in Archaeology. Gloucester: Alan Sutton. ISBN 0-86299-362-8.
