= Gerhard Bersu =

German archaeologist (1889–1964)

- Born: September 26, 1889; Jauer, Silesia, German Empire
- Died: November 19, 1964 (aged 75); Magdeburg, East Germany
- Occupation: Archaeologist
- Organization: German Archaeological Institute
- Spouse: Maria Bersu

Gerhard Bersu (26 September 1889 – 19 November 1964) was a German archaeologist who excavated widely across Europe. He was forced into exile from Germany in 1937 due to antisemitic laws in pre-war Nazi Germany. He was interned on the Isle of Man during World War II where he made several significant archaeological discoveries such as the Viking boat burial at Balladoole.

== Early life ==
He was born in Jauer in Silesia in 1889 to a Jewish father. He was interested in prehistory from a young age and began his archaeological career while still a school boy, by joining in Carl Schuchhardt's excavations near Potsdam in 1907.

In successive years Bersu dug in several European countries such as France, Switzerland, Italy, and Greece. He worked under Hubert Schmidt in the excavations at Cucuteni. Romania.

During the First World War he worked for the Office for the Protection of Monuments and Collections on the Western Front. After the war he was attached to the German Armistice and Peace delegations.

In 1924 he began working with the German Archaeological Institute at Frankfurt-am-Main. In 1928 he became the institution's Second Director and oversaw the acquisition of new buildings. He rose to the position of Director in 1931 and the institution became a "centre at which scholars from all Europe and beyond met to discuss the problems of archaeology" under his guidance.

After the Nuremberg Laws were passed in 1935, Bersu was forced to resign his post as a director due to his Jewish heritage. He was reassigned to a lower position at the German Archaeological Institute as Officer of Excavations, Berlin in 1935 and then was forced to retire later that year.

== Little Woodbury excavations ==
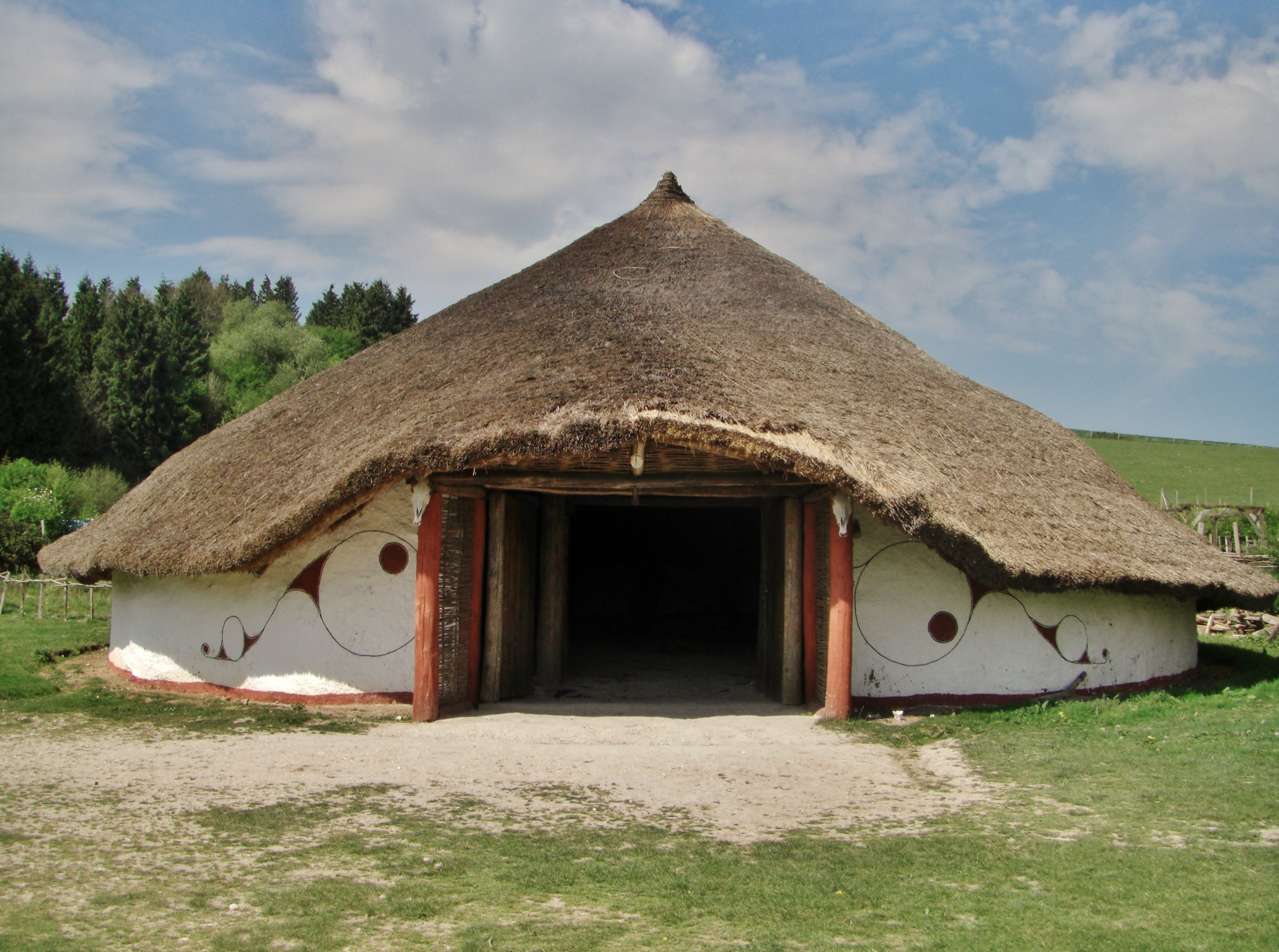
A reconstruction of an Iron Age roundhouse at Little Woodbury

Following his forced resignation from the German Archaeological Institute and the worsening antisemitic laws in Germany Bersu emigrated to Britain with his wife in 1937.

At the invitation of British archaeologist Osbert Crawford as the president of the Prehistoric Society, Bersu conducted excavations in 1938 and 1939 at Little Woodbury in Wiltshire, introducing novel continental methods to the study of British prehistoric sites. The site had been first identified as a crop mark from an aerial photograph of the area, but it was not until Bersu's excavations that the significance of the site was realised.

Bersu's systematic investigation was revolutionary for its time in England, and his excavation helped to reinterpret earlier misconceptions of Iron Age Britain. Before Bersu's investigations, it was believed that the inhabitants of these sites lived in holes in the ground due to the discovery of dug pits from similar sites. But Bersu's identification of cereal grains and animals bones showed that these were storage pits for food, and the discovery of large postholes helped Bersu to convince British archaeologists that the inhabitants lived in a large Iron Age roundhouse that was also excavated on the site.

Bersu also introduced new methods from continental Europe regarding the digging of trenches and the investigation of timber post remains that were one of the few remnants of the domestic dwellings on the site.

== Internment ==
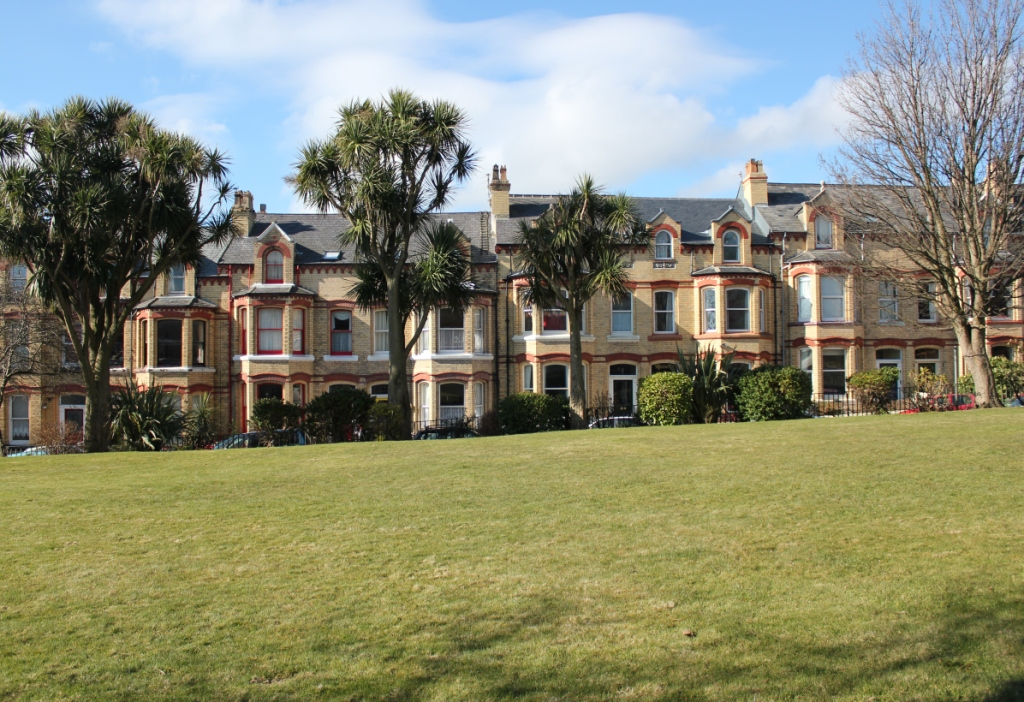
Hutchinson Square, Douglas - the site of Hutchinson Internment Camp where Bersu was initially interned.

Upon the outbreak of the Second World War, Bersu and his wife were interned on the Isle of Man as "enemy aliens" with other German-born residents. Initially they were separated, with neither aware of the others location, with Maria in Rushen Camp, and Bersu in Hutchinson Internment Camp, Douglas. But in October 1940, they were reunited when interned married couples were permitted to meet at Derby Castle in Douglas. Later they were able to live together at Rushen Camp, which was Europe's only internment camp for married couples during World War II.

Director of the Manx Museum, Basil Megaw immediately saw the potential of having Bersu investigate some of the Isle of Man's significant archaeological sites. Bersu's fellow archaeologists and friends such Gordon Childe and Christopher Hawkes lobbied on his behalf to allow excavations on the Island to be conducted.

Bersu was allowed to continue his research with the help of other internees and his wife Maria who did much of the recording of the excavation. They excavated a number of later prehistoric and Viking‐age sites and several important discoveries were made at Chapel Hill at Balladoole, Ballanorris, Ronaldsway, and Ballacagan. At Balladoole, Bersu expected to excavate an Iron Age hill fort, but instead also discovered Mesolithic remains; a Bronze Age cist; a Christian keeill (a small chapel); a Christian burial ground, and a Viking Age boat burial. The discovery of additional human remains at Ballateare and Balladoole have been interpreted as examples of Viking ritual slave sacrifice.

Most of Bersu's investigations on the Isle of Man were at locations accessible by public transports, as neither he nor any of the other internees had cars. As Bersu used fellow internees for the excavations, however despite the presence of armed guards, they were not permitted to use pickaxes. Instead, the digging was done with trowels.

Bersu and his wife continued living and excavating on the Isle of Man after the end of World War II until 1947.

== Later years ==
When the war ended Bersu was offered the Chair of the Royal Irish Academy in Dublin and remained there until 1950 when he returned to Germany. Taking up his former post at the Institute he continued his work until retiring in 1956.

Bersu excavated at the settlement of Green Craig, Creich, Fife in 1947.

Bersu died suddenly while attending a meeting of the German Academy of Sciences in Magdeburg.
