= Mana Expedition to Easter Island =

Archaeological expedition to Rapa Nui

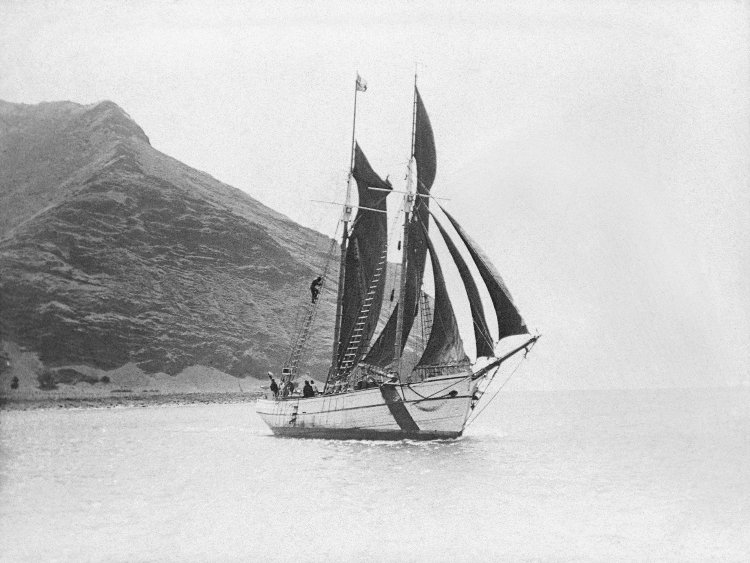
The Mana at Easter Island, 1914.

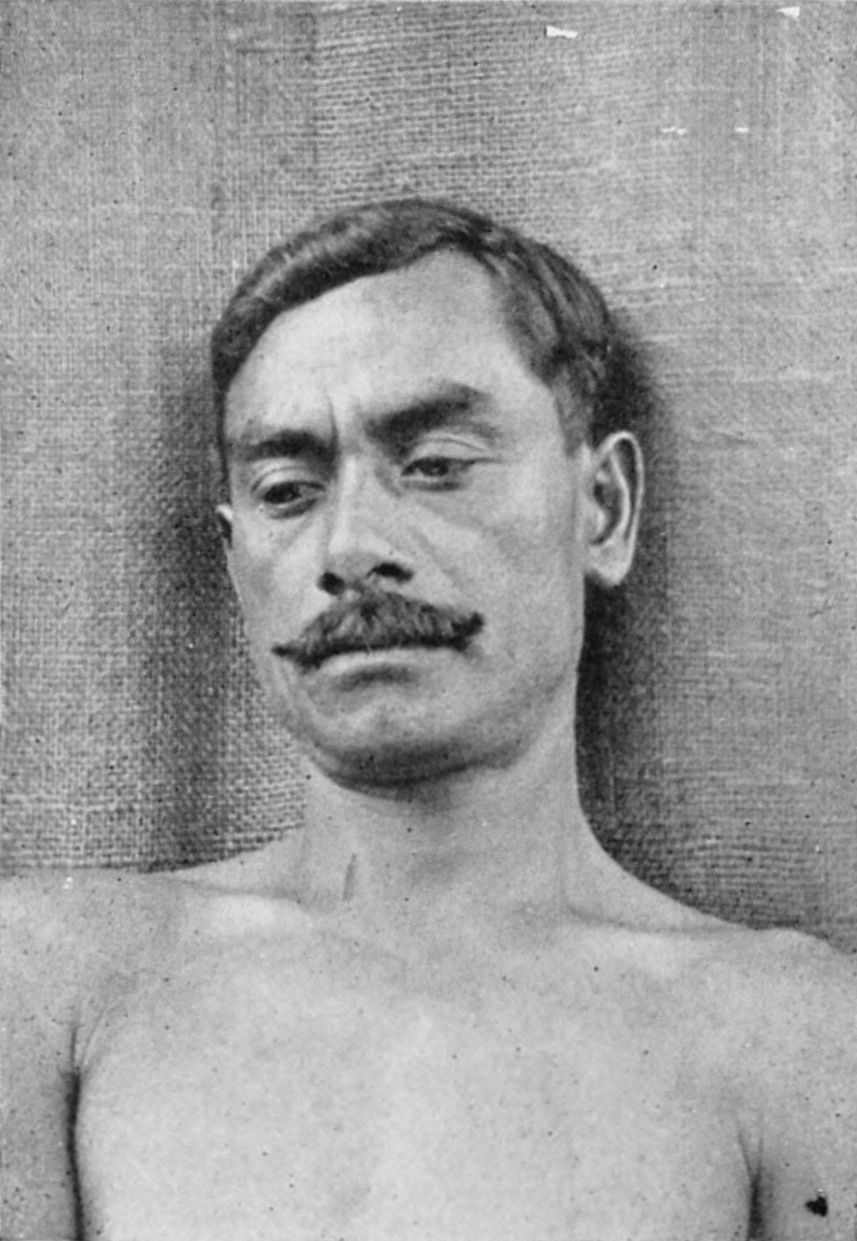
Juan Tepano (1867–1947), the Rapa Nui guide for the expedition.

The Mana Expedition to Easter Island (Polynesian: mana means "good luck") occurred between March 1913 and August 1915. It was the first archaeological expedition to Easter Island which was privately organized and funded, preceding the Norwegian Archaeological Expedition to Easter Island of Thor Heyerdahl by more than 40 years. The Mana Expedition was led by Katherine and William Scoresby Routledge. The expedition and its ship, the Mana, bore the same name. The ship left Falmouth, England on 13 March 1913 with a crew of twelve, including a surveyor, geologist, sailing master, navigator, engineer, cook, seamen, a cabin boy and the Routledges. They arrived on the southern coast of the island at Hanga Roa Bay, by way of the Strait of Magellan, on 29 March 1914, setting up their first camp at Mataveri, on the island's southwest corner. The English archaeologist O. G. S. Crawford referred to the expedition as "an archaeological fiasco".

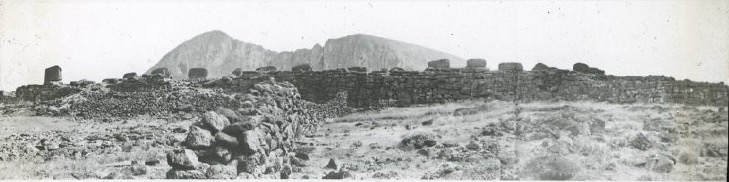
The expedition included the Ahu Tongariki excavation, 1914

== See also ==
- Katherine Routledge
