= Balladoole =

Historic monument site on the Isle of Man

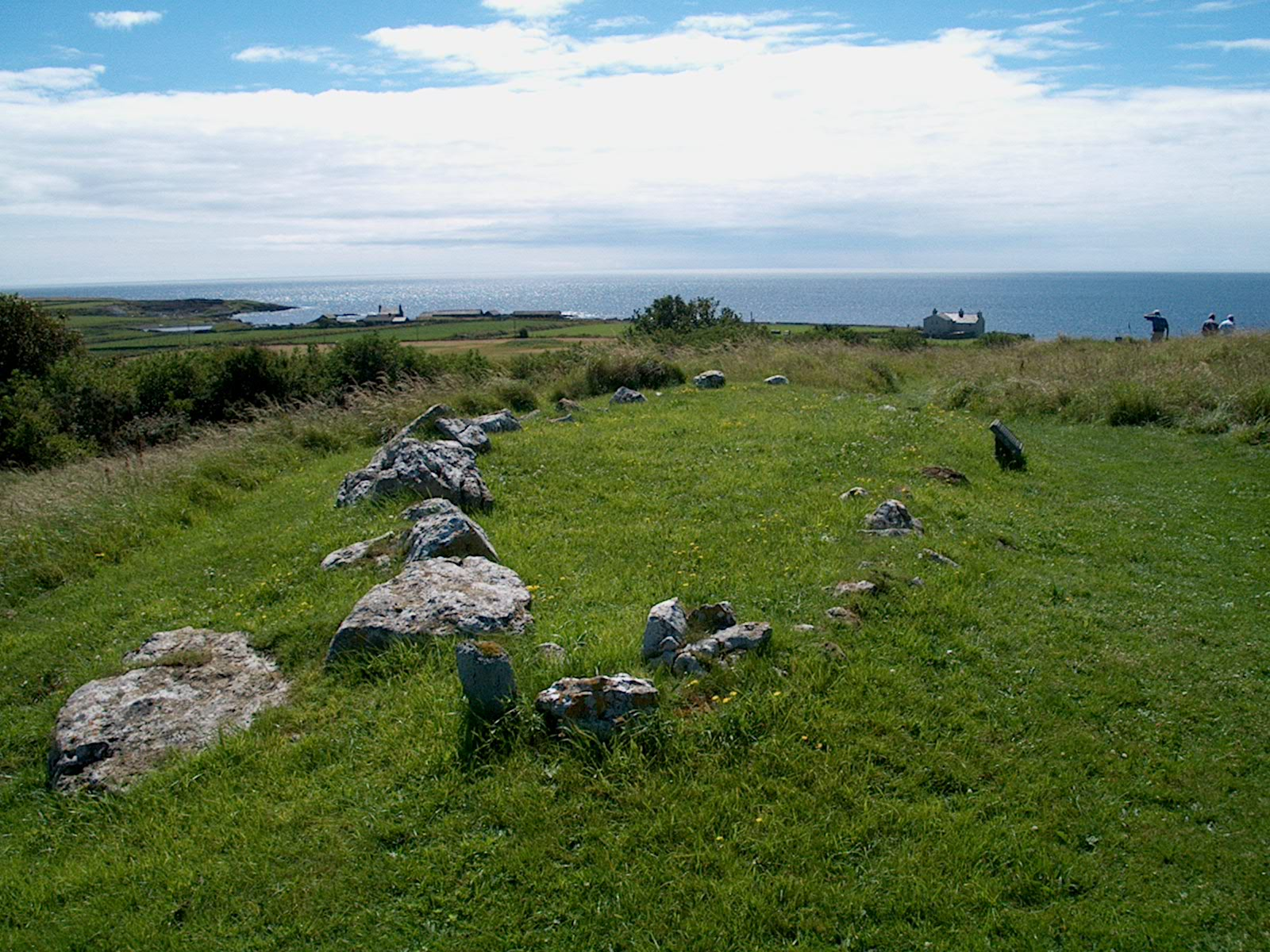
- The stone outline of the Viking boat burial

- Map of the Isle of Man showing the location of Balladoole
- Interactive map of Balladoole
- 54.07964°N 4.68203°W
- Periods: Mesolithic, Bronze Age, Iron Age, Medieval, Viking
- Location: Chapel Hill, Balladoole, Arbory
- Region: Isle of Man

Site notes
- Archaeologists: Gerhard Bersu, Basil Megaw, J.R. Bruce
- Owner: Manx National Heritage
- Public access: Yes

Chapel Hill, Balladoole is a significant historical and archaeological site in Arbory on the Isle of Man. The site is a short distance from Castletown in the south of the Island. It is located on a small hilltop overlooking the coast. Balladoole has undergone extensive archaeological excavations in the 20th century, most notably in 1944-1945 by German archaeologist Gerhard Bersu who was interned on the Isle of Man during World War II.

The site has been in ritual use for millennia: archaeological excavations of the hilltop have uncovered Mesolithic remains; a Bronze Age cist; an Iron Age hill fort; a Christian keeill (a small chapel); a Christian burial ground, and a Viking Age boat burial.

== Excavations ==
The first major excavation of the site took place towards the end of World War II. German archaeologist Gerhard Bersu and his wife were interned on the Isle of Man in 1940 as "enemy aliens". Bersu was permitted to use a team of internees to conduct excavations of significant archaeological sites on the Island during their internment. As Bersu used fellow internees for the excavations, they were not permitted to use pickaxes despite the presence of armed guards. Instead, the digging was done with trowels. The discovery of the Viking Age boat burial was an accident; Bersu and his team were originally expecting to excavate an Iron Age hill fort.

The site was also excavated in 1951 by Basil Megaw the director of the Manx Museum, and later again in 1974 by J.R. Bruce.

== Archaeological sites ==
=== Mesolithic remains ===
The excavated remains of middens belonging to the native hunter-gather communities on the site have provided evidence for human activity at Balladoole from the Mesolithic period.

=== Bronze Age cist ===
The remnants of a small Bronze Age burial cist dating to c. 1000 BC are located on the north side of the site. It is missing a capstone, and there are no records of any finds from inside the cist itself, although it is possible anything from the period may have been destroyed by later activity. Tiny fragments of a Bronze Age cremation urn have been discovered below the floor of the Christian kiell. This indicates that the original pre-historic burial site may have been reused by Christians centuries later.

=== Iron Age hill fort ===
An earthwork promontory hill fort encircles the site. Very little of the original stone that faced the earthwork survived although the amount of collapsed stone that was excavated suggests that the wall may have been as high as 3 metres in parts. A number of postholes that may have held up very large wooden gates have been excavated which has helped to date the hill fort. The hill fort may have been used for defensive purposes although the large gaps in the earthwork have raised doubts about the defensive capability of the site.

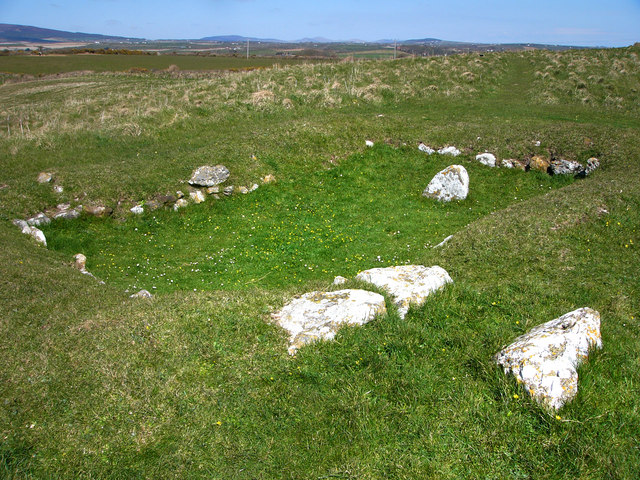
The keeill at Balladoole

=== Keeill Vael ===
The remains of an ancient keeill on the site has been dated to between 900 AD and 1000 AD. A keeill is a small simple chapel built between the 6th and 12th centuries on the Isle of Man. It is this keeill that gave rise to the current name of the site: Chapel Hill.

Very little of the original keeill remains. In the 19th century many of the stones were removed for building materials in local structures so that the only architectural feature that remains is the doorway towards the west end of the south wall. The keeill was built on top of an older, low paved platform. The discovery of tiny fragments of a Bronze Age cremation urn below the keeill indicates that the Christians who built it reused an earlier Bronze Age structure. Due to the very small size of the keeill, it would not have been used for congregational worship, but rather solely for liturgical purposes.

=== Christian burial ground ===
Balladoole is also the site on an ancient Christian burial ground. Seventeen early Medieval stone lined lintel graves were excavated by Bersu in the 1940s. Several of the graves were disturbed by the later Viking burial.

=== Viking boat burial ===
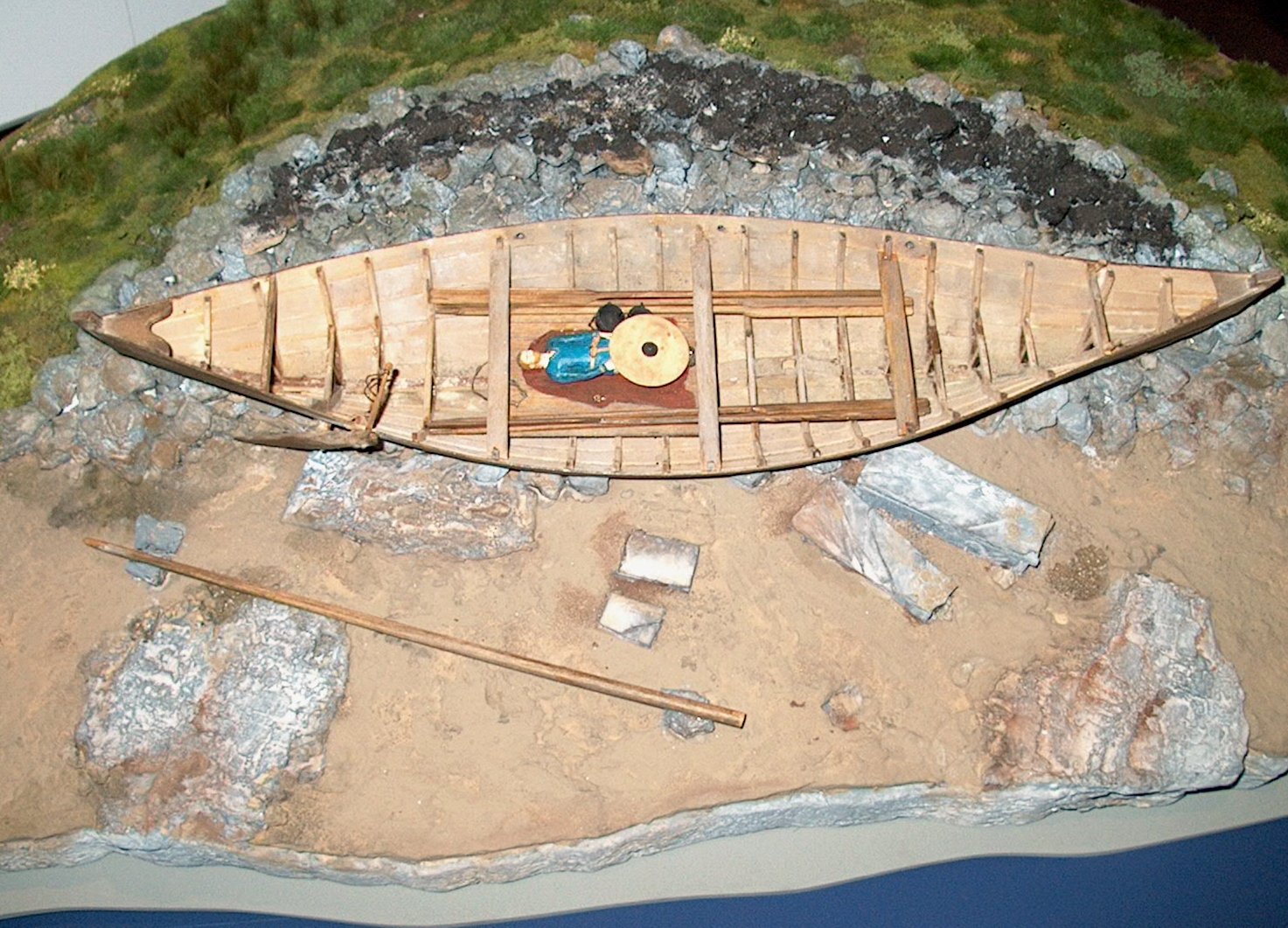
Model from the Manx Museum of what the Viking boat burial may have looked like.

The remains of an 11 metre long Viking boat that dates back to between 850AD and 950AD was excavated by Gerhard Bersu in 1945. The boat was a clinker-built oak vessel and was typical of the trading vessels that travelled the trading routes in the Irish Sea during this period. Although the boat timbers have long rotted away, the iron nails that held it together mark its exact location and a stone cairn that is still visible today outlines the boat. A large mound would have covered the site, but much of this was removed during Bersu's excavations as it was thought to make up part of the earlier Iron Age fortifications.

The site is 350 metres uphill from the shore and is at the highest point of the hill, so it would have required significant manpower to bring the vessel to the site. This indicates that the man interred in the boat was of high social standing in the community and may have been an important landowner, a chieftain, or a merchant.

The burial cairn was covered with the cremated remains of animals and the presence of at least one additional corpse hints at the possibility of human sacrifice. Significant grave goods were excavated from the Viking boat burial at Balladoole and many are on display in the Manx Museum in Douglas:

These included a bronze ring-headed pin and a gilded belt buckle. There were also iron knives, a flint strike-a-light, and an iron cauldron. The most spectacular items, however, were a collection of riding gear, including a bridle, stirrups and spurs with ornamental buckles. There was also a shield, but no sword.

The boat was buried directly on top of and into older Christian graves. This may have been a deliberate slighting of the earlier graves, possibly as a sign of pagan Norse domination over the local Christian population.
