= Eric Megaw =

Irish (Belfast-educated) engineer

Eric Christopher Stanley Megaw MBE (1908 – 25 January 1956) was an Irish (Belfast-educated) engineer who refined the power of the cavity magnetron for radar purposes (detection of U-boats) in the Second World War. He was appointed an MBE in 1943.

== Early life ==
He was born in Dublin. Two of his younger brothers, Peter Megaw and Basil Megaw, attended the same grammar school as him in Belfast. He was the son of Arthur Stanley Megaw who married Helen Smith. He attended Campbell College and Queen's University Belfast.

He was an active radio amateur, and while still at school was the first amateur operator to manage contact between Ireland and Australia. After graduating from Queen's at the age of 20, he was awarded a research fellowship at Imperial College, London. He was fluent in French, German and Italian. His name has sometimes been erroneously spelled Eric McGaw.

== Career ==
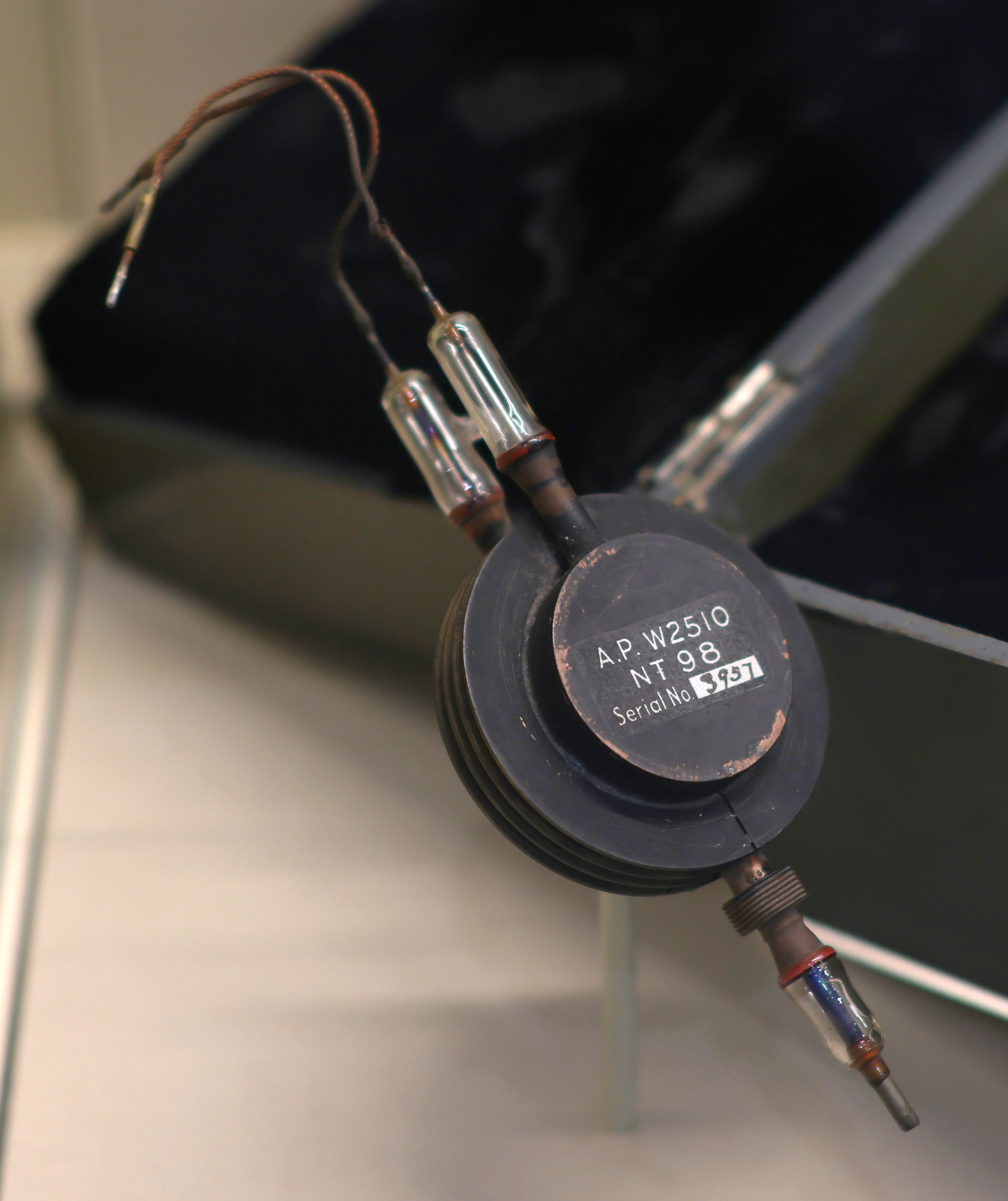
E1189 cavity magnetron

He was the leader of a group working on the cavity magnetron from April 1940 in north-west London. The cavity magnetron was producing power of around 500W (E1188 version). Eric Megaw changed the design, coating the cathode with oxides (E1189 version) and eight segments from six, to increase the power to 100 kW by September 1940, enough to detect submarines. The first trial on board an aircraft took place in March 1941.

The greatly-improved cavity magnetron would be valuable to the Tizard Mission.

== See also ==
- History of radar
- List of World War II British naval radar
