= Margaret Mann Phillips =

- Born: 1906
- Died: 1987 (aged 80–81)
- Occupation: Academic
- Spouse: Charles Phillips
- Parent: Revd. Francis Arthur Mann

Academic background
- Education: York College for Girls
- Alma mater: Somerville College, Oxford University
- Thesis: (1934)

Academic work
- Discipline: Renaissance literature and history
- Institutions: University of Bordeaux
- Main interests: Erasmus
- Notable works: Erasmus and the northern Renaissance

Margaret Mann Phillips FRSL (1906–1987) was a British academic who specialized in Renaissance literature and history. She is most noted for her work on Erasmus.

== Early and personal life ==
Phillips was born on 23 January 1906 in Kimberworth, Yorkshire, England. She was the daughter of a rector, the Revd. Francis Arthur Mann, and was educated first at home and later at the now-closed York College for Girls. In 1924, she won a scholarship to Somerville College, Oxford to study modern languages. She graduated with first class honours in French in 1927, completed a diploma in education in 1928. She then undertook further study at the Sorbonne, University of Manchester, and Westfield College, London.

In 1940, Phillips married Charles William Phillips. Between 1945 and 1956, she took a leave from academia to devote her time to her family. Together with her husband, she had one son and one daughter.

== Career ==
Phillips' academic career started with posts at the University of Bordeaux and the University of Manchester and then at St Hilda's College, Oxford. She studied further in Paris getting her PhD from the University of Paris in 1934. Phillips became a Fellow of Newnham College, Cambridge University, in 1936 and lectured in French until 1945. After a period away from academia she returned to teaching in the late 1950s.

== Appointments ==
Her appointments and fellowships included:

- Warburg Institute
- Honorary Fellow. University College London
- Fellow of the Royal Society of Literature

== Selected publications ==
- Erasmus and the Northern Renaissance. Hodder & Stoughton for the English Universities Press, 1949.
- The "Adages" of Erasmus; a study with translations. Cambridge University Press, Cambridge, 1964.
