= Peter Megaw =

Irish architectural historian and archaeologist

Peter Megaw CBE, CStJ
- Born: Arthur Hubert Stanley Megaw; 20 July 1910; Portobello, Dublin, United Kingdom of Great Britain and Ireland
- Died: 28 May 2006 (aged 95); Hampstead, London, England
- Title: Director of the British School at Athens (1962–1968)
- Spouse: Elektra Elena Mangoletsi (m. 1937; died 1993)
- Relatives: Eric Megaw, Basil Megaw (brothers)

Academic background
- Education: Campbell College
- Alma mater: Peterhouse, Cambridge

Academic work
- Institutions: Department of Antiquities, Cyprus; Dumbarton Oaks; Byzantine Institute of America; British School at Athens

Arthur Hubert Stanley "Peter" Megaw, CBE, CStJ (20 July 1910 – 28 June 2006), was an architectural historian and archaeologist. He specialised in Byzantine churches. He served as Director of the Department of Antiquities, Cyprus, between 1935 and 1960 and as Director of the British School at Athens from 1962 to 1968.

== Early life ==
Megaw was born on 20 July 1910 at Portobello House nursing home in Portobello, Dublin, Ireland. He was the second of four sons of Arthur Stanley Megaw, a solicitor, and his wife, Helen Isabel Bertha Megaw (née Smith). Between 1924 and 1928, he was educated at Campbell College, Belfast, a boys' boarding school. He went on to read architecture at Peterhouse, Cambridge, at the same time as the actor James Mason, graduating in 1931. Two of his brothers, Basil Megaw and Eric Megaw, also had notable careers in their own fields.

== Career ==
Megaw never held an academic post at a university. He spent 75 years "working on the study and preservation of the monuments of the Christian East". He first joined the British School at Athens as Walston Student in 1931, to study Byzantine architecture. He served as the first Director of the Department of Antiquities, Cyprus between 1935 and 1960. In Cyprus he excavated the Kourion episcopal basilica and the Medieval fortress at Saranta Kolones.

With the independence of Cyprus from British Rule in 1960, he spent two short, successive posts at Dumbarton Oaks in Washington DC and at the Byzantine Institute of America in Istanbul, Turkey. He served as Director of the British School at Athens from 1962 to 1968. Following his early retirement from the directorship, he joined the Harvard Centre for Byzantine Studies at Dumbarton Oaks as a visiting scholar. He spent the remaining years of the 1960s and the 1970s splitting his time between Cyprus and the United States.

Megaw's work can be seen in the photographic collection held at the Conway Library, Courtauld Institute of Art.

== Later life ==
Megaw died of cancer on 28 June 2006 at his London home in Hampstead. He was cremated on 20 July 2006 at Golders Green Crematorium, London.

== Personal life ==
Megaw was known to his friends and colleagues as Peter. In 1937, he married Elektra Elena Mangoletsi. She was an artist who was born in 1905. She died in 1993. They did not have any children.

In Cyprus he also acted as a public information officer and an intelligence officer on behalf of the island's British colonial government.

== Honours ==
In June 1949, he was appointed Serving Brother of the Venerable Order of Saint John (SBStJ). In the 1951 King's Birthday Honours, he was appointed Commander of the Order of the British Empire (CBE). He was promoted to Commander of the Venerable Order of Saint John (CStJ) in September 1967.

In 1995, the Society of Antiquaries of London awarded him the Frend medal. This is an award for studies related to the archaeology, history and topography of the early Christian Church. The book Mosaic: festschrift for A.H.S. Megaw was published in 2001 in his honour.

== Publications ==
- Megaw, A. H. (1946). Three vaulted basilicas in Cyprus. The Journal of Hellenic Studies, 66, 48–56.
- Megaw, A. H. (1951). Report of the Department of Antiquities, Cyprus: 1937–1939. Nicosia: Government Printing Office.
- Megaw, A. H. (1972). Supplementary excavations on a castle site at Paphos, Cyprus, 1970–1971. Dumbarton Oaks Papers, 323–343.
- Megaw, A. H. S. (1974). Byzantine architecture and decoration in Cyprus: metropolitan or provincial?. Dumbarton Oaks Papers, 28, 57–88.
- Megaw, A. H. (1976). Excavations at the episcopal basilica of Kourion in Cyprus in 1974 and 1975: A preliminary report. Dumbarton Oaks Papers, 30, 345–371.
- Megaw, A. H. S., & Jones, R. E. (1983). Byzantine and allied pottery: A contribution by chemical analysis to problems of origin and distribution. Annual of the British School at Athens, 78, 235–263.
- Megaw, A. H. S. et al. (2007). Kourion. Excavations in the Episcopal Precinct. Dumbarton Oaks Research Library and Collection. Harvard.
