= O. G. S. Crawford =

British archaeologist (1886–1957)

O. G. S. Crawford CBE FBA FSA
- Born: Osbert Guy Stanhope Crawford; 28 October 1886; Breach Candy, Bombay, British India
- Died: 28 November 1957 (aged 71); Nursling, Hampshire, England, United Kingdom
- Occupation: Archaeologist
- Known for: Aerial photography pioneer

Osbert Guy Stanhope Crawford CBE FBA FSA (28 October 1886 – 28 November 1957) was a British archaeologist who specialised in the archaeology of prehistoric Britain and Sudan. A keen proponent of aerial archaeology, he spent most of his career as the archaeological officer of the Ordnance Survey (OS) and also wrote a range of books on archaeological subjects.

Born in Bombay, British India, to a wealthy middle-class Scottish family, Crawford moved to England as an infant and was raised by his aunts in London and Hampshire. He read geography at Keble College, Oxford, and worked briefly in that field before devoting himself professionally to archaeology. Employed by the philanthropist Henry Wellcome, Crawford oversaw the excavation of Abu Geili in Sudan before returning to England shortly before the First World War. During the conflict he served in both the London Scottish Regiment and the Royal Flying Corps, where he was involved in ground and aerial reconnaissance along the Western Front. After an injury forced a period of convalescence in England, he returned to the Western Front, where he was captured by the German Army in 1918 and held as a prisoner of war until the end of the conflict.

In 1920, Crawford was employed by the Ordnance Survey, touring Britain to plot the location of archaeological sites, and in the process identified several that were previously unknown. Increasingly interested in aerial archaeology, he used Royal Air Force photographs to identify the extent of the Stonehenge Avenue, excavating it in 1923. With the archaeologist Alexander Keiller, he conducted an aerial survey of many counties in southern England and raised the finances to secure the land around Stonehenge for The National Trust. In 1927, he established the scholarly journal Antiquity, which contained contributions from many of Britain's most prominent archaeologists, and in 1939 he served as president of The Prehistoric Society. An internationalist and socialist, he came under the influence of Marxism and for a time became a Soviet sympathiser. During the Second World War he worked with the National Buildings Record, photographically documenting Southampton. After retiring in 1946, he refocused his attention on Sudanese archaeology and wrote several further books prior to his death.

Friends and colleagues remembered Crawford as a cantankerous and irritable individual. His contributions to British archaeology, including in Antiquity and aerial archaeology, have been widely acclaimed; some have referred to him as one of the great pioneering figures in the field. His photographic archive remained of use to archaeologists into the 21st century. A biography of Crawford by Kitty Hauser was published in 2008.

== Early life ==
=== Childhood: 1886–1904 ===
O. G. S. Crawford was born on 28 October 1886 at Breach Candy, a suburb of Bombay in British India. His father, Charles Edward Gordon Crawford, was a civil servant who had been educated at Marlborough College and Wadham College, Oxford before moving to India, where he became a High Court judge at Thane. The Crawford family came from Ayrshire in Scotland, and the child's great-uncle was the politician Robert Wigram Crawford. Crawford's mother, Alice Luscombe Mackenzie, was the daughter of a Scottish army doctor and his Devonshire wife. Alice died a few days after her son's birth, and so when he was three months old, Crawford was sent to England aboard the P&O liner Bokhara. During the journey he was entrusted to the care of his paternal aunt Eleanor, an Anglican nun who was the head of the Poona Convent of the Community of St Mary the Virgin.

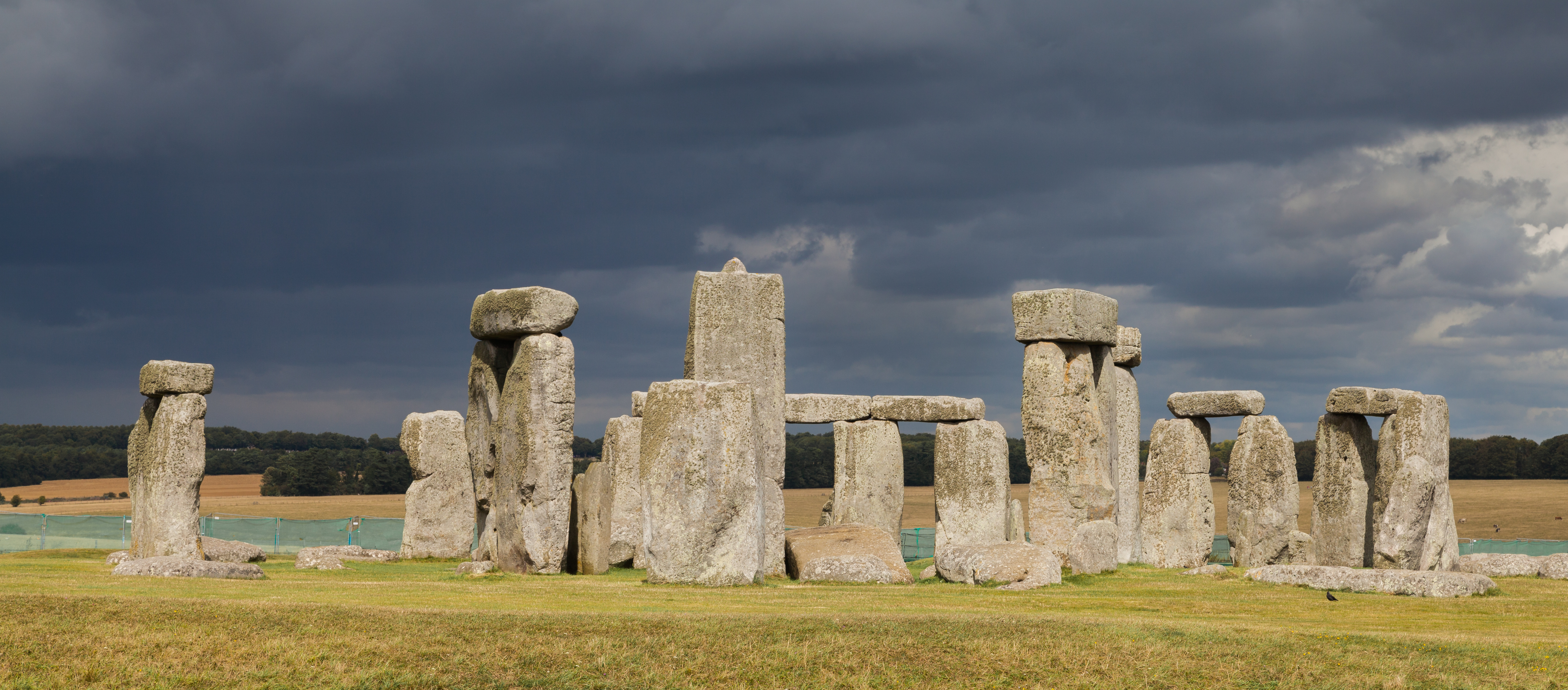
Crawford developed a love of archaeology through visiting sites like Stonehenge in Wiltshire

In Britain, he spent the next seven years with two paternal aunts who lived together near to Portland Place in the Marylebone district of central London. Like his father, they were devout Christians, having been the children of a Scottish clergyman. Under their guardianship Crawford had little contact with other children or with men. Crawford saw his father on the few occasions that the latter visited England, prior to his death in India in 1894. In 1895, Crawford and his two aunts moved to a rural house in East Woodhay, Hampshire. Initially educated at Park House School, which he enjoyed, he was then moved to Marlborough College, his father's alma mater. He was unhappy there, complaining about bullying and enforced sporting activities, and characterising it as a "detestable house of torture".

At the school, Crawford was influenced by his housemaster, F. B. Malim, who presided over the archaeological section of the college's Natural History Society and encouraged the boy's interest in the subject. It is possible that Malim provided something of a father figure for the young Crawford. With the society, Crawford visited such archaeological sites as Stonehenge, West Kennet Long Barrow, Avebury, and Martinsell. It was also through the society that he obtained Ordnance Survey maps of the landscape, allowing him to explore the downs near to his aunts' home. He began excavation of a barrow near to Bull's Copse, thus attracting the attention of the antiquarian Harold Peake, who was then involved in compiling the Victoria County History of Berkshire. Peake and his wife lived a Bohemian lifestyle, being vegetarians and social reformers, and their ideas had a strong impact on Crawford. Under the Peakes' influence, Crawford rejected his religious upbringing in favour of a rationalist world-view based in science. Crawford gained an appreciation from Peake for the understanding of past societies through an examination of the geographical landscape rather than simply through texts or artefacts.

=== University and early career: 1905–1914 ===
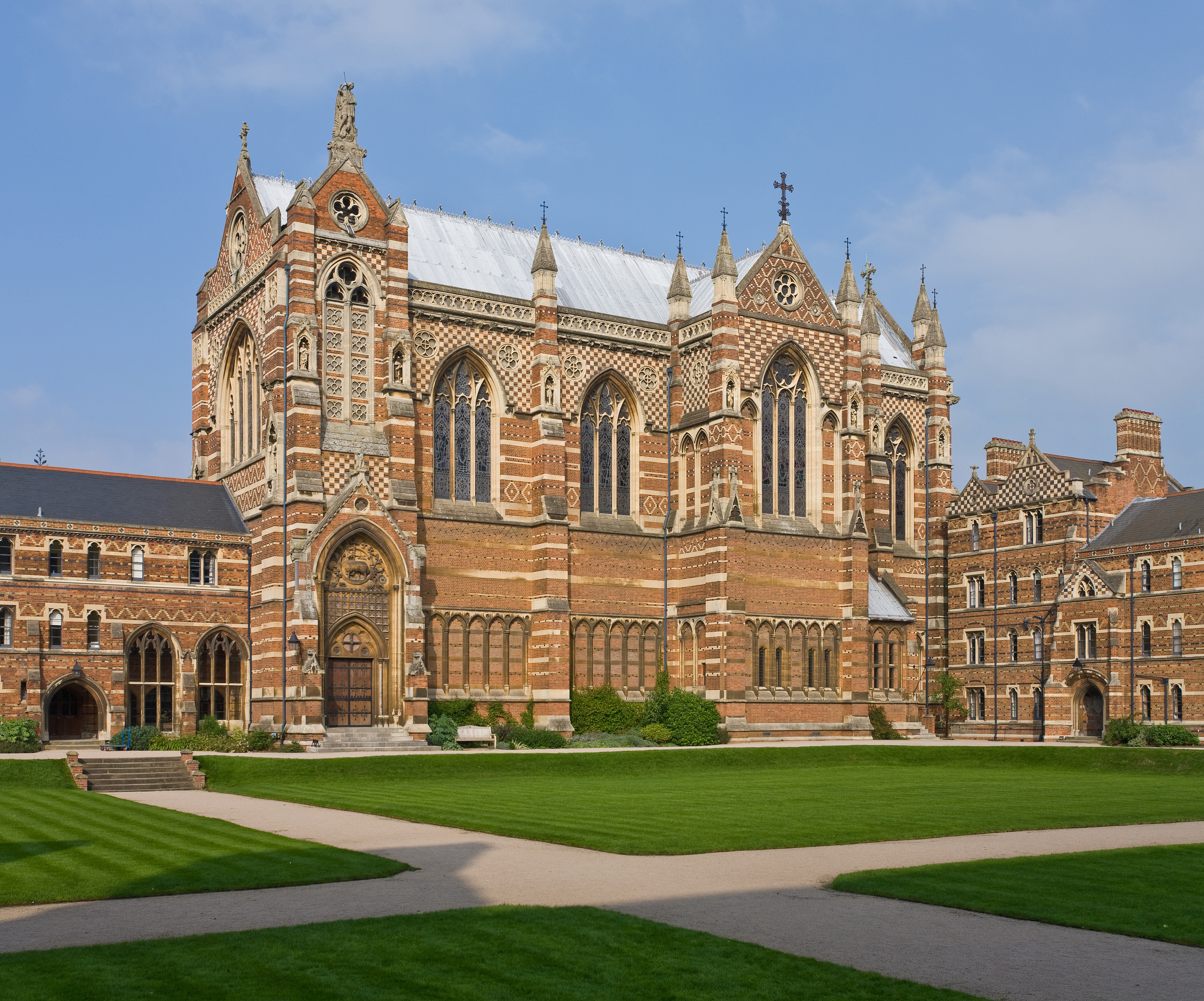
Keble College, Oxford

Following his schooling, Crawford won a junior scholarship to study at Keble College, Oxford. There he began reading literae humaniores in 1905 but – after gaining only a third-class score in his second year exams – he switched courses to study geography in 1908. In 1910 he gained a distinction for his diploma, for which he had conducted a study of the landscape surrounding Andover. Reflecting his interest in the relationship between geography and archaeology, during a walking tour of Ireland he had also written a paper on the geographic distribution of Bronze Age flat bronze axes and beakers in the British Isles. It was presented to the Oxford University Anthropological Society before being published in The Geographical Journal. The archaeologist Grahame Clark later related that the paper "marked a milestone in British Archaeology; it was the first real attempt to deduce prehistoric events from the geographical distribution of archaeological objects". Crawford's fellow archaeologist Mark Bowden stated that while archaeological distribution maps had been previously produced, "archaeological data had never before been married with environmental information" in the way that Crawford did in this article.

After Crawford graduated, Professor A. J. Herbertson offered him a job as a junior demonstrator in the university's geography department. Crawford agreed, and served in the teaching position over the ensuing year. Through Herbertson, Crawford was introduced to the geographer Patrick Geddes. Crawford then decided to focus his attentions on archaeology rather than geography even though few professional positions in the field existed in Britain at the time. Looking elsewhere for archaeological employment, he unsuccessfully applied for a Craven Fellowship and for a post at Bombay Museum.

At Herbertson's recommendation, in 1913 Crawford gained employment as an assistant on William Scoresby Routledge and Katherine Routledge's expedition to Easter Island in the Pacific Ocean. The expedition had the intention of learning more about the island's first inhabitants and its Moai statues. After the team departed from Britain aboard the schooner Mana, Crawford began quarrelling with the Routledges. Informing them that they had demonstrated an "extraordinary lack of courtesy" and "appalling stinginess" toward both him and other crew members, he left the ship at Cape Verde and returned to Britain. He then gained employment from the wealthy philanthropist Henry Wellcome, who sent him to Egypt to gain further training in archaeological excavation from G. A. Reisner. Wellcome then sent him to Sudan, where Crawford was given charge of the excavation of the Meroitic site at Abu Geili, remaining there from January to June 1914. On his return to England—where he was planning on sorting through the artefacts found in Sudan—he and his friend Earnest Hooton began excavation of a long barrow on Wexcombe Down in Wiltshire.

=== First World War: 1914–1918 ===
It was while Crawford was engaged in this excavation that the United Kingdom entered the First World War. At Peake's encouragement, Crawford enlisted in the British Army, joining the London Scottish Regiment and was sent to reinforce the First Battalion on the Western Front. The battalion marched to Béthune to relieve the British line, fighting at Givenchy. Crawford was afflicted with influenza and malaria, and in February 1915 he was invalided back to England and stationed at Birmingham for his recuperation. After he recovered, he applied to join the Royal Flying Corps (RFC) but was deemed too heavy. He was commissioned in May 1915. In July 1915 he joined the Royal Berkshire Regiment as part of the Third Army, being stationed at Beauval and then St. Pol. Using his existing skills, he served as the regiment's maps officer, and was responsible for mapping the areas around the front line, including German Army positions. He also took photographs which were used for British propaganda purposes, and in 1916 he guided the writer H. G. Wells around the trenches on the latter's visit to the Front.

[Archaeology] will provide new material for the education of future generations — material that, if it is used at all, must help to weaken the consciousness of nationality and strengthen that of universal brotherhood. It has done that for me at any rate.

— Crawford, in a letter to H.G. Wells.

In January 1917, Crawford successfully applied to join the RFC as an observer with 23 Squadron RFC, which flew over enemy lines to make observations and draw maps. On his maiden flight, the German Army opened fire on his aircraft, and his right foot was pierced by bullets and badly injured. To recuperate, he spent time at various hospitals in France and England before being sent to the RFC Auxiliary Hospital at the Heligan estate in Cornwall. During this time in England he spent a weekend at Wells's home in Dunmow, Essex, embracing the latter's desire for a united world government and the idea that writing about global history was a contribution to that cause. While at Heligan, Crawford began work on a book, Man and his Past, in which he examined a broad sweep of human history from an archaeological and geographical perspective.

In September 1917, Crawford—who had been promoted to the position of squadron intelligence officer—joined 48 Squadron RFC, for which he again took aerial photographs during reconnaissance missions. While on one flight in February 1918, Crawford's aircraft was shot at and forced to land in German-held territory; he and his pilot were taken as prisoners of war. He was initially imprisoned at Landshut in Bavaria, from where he tried to escape by swimming down the River Isar; the river current proved too strong and he was soon recaptured. He was then transferred to Holzminden prisoner-of-war camp, where he was aware of an escape plan involving tunnelling out of the camp, but did not take part. Instead he spent much of his time working on Man and his Past and reading works by Wells, Carl Jung, and Samuel Butler. Crawford remained in the camp for seven months, until the declaration of armistice, at which he returned to Britain and was demobilised.

== Career: 1920–1945 ==
=== Ordnance Survey and Antiquity ===
I appointed O. G. S. Crawford to the Ordnance Survey as Archaeological Officer in October 1920. I consulted Marett and he said that Crawford was just the man for the post, which I established to get the archaeology of the national maps into order: for there still survived "giants' graves" and such titles, and a larger number of objects of antiquarian interest remained unmarked on the maps ... No one could have been more thorough and capable in carrying out this most interesting work, and, so far as his labours extended the maps presented to the public a mass of archaeological information shown by no other national surveys.

— Charles Close

Back in England, Crawford finished writing Man and his Past, which was published by Oxford University Press in 1921. According to the historian of archaeology Adam Stout, the book was "a manifesto, a rallying-cry for a new generation of archaeologists who shared in the idealism and the faith in the potential of Progress". Bowden suggested that it could be seen as a "manifesto for geoarchaeology, environmental archaeology and economic archaeology. The unifying theme is that all these topics should be approached through the compilation of maps". In discussing geographical methods for delineating "cultures", the work fit within the theoretical trend of culture-historical archaeology, but did not attempt to apply the concept of culture in a systematic fashion.

Crawford also returned to field work, carrying out archaeological excavation for the Cambrian Archaeological Association in both Wiltshire and Wales. In mid-1920, he excavated at Roundwood, Hampshire and on the Isle of Wight for Sir William Portal.

His expertise resulted in his being invited by Charles Close, the Director-General of the Ordnance Survey (OS), to join that organisation as their first archaeological officer. Accepting the position, Crawford moved to Southampton and began work at the project in October 1920. His arrival at the OS generated some resentment, with co-workers often seeing his post as superfluous and deeming archaeology to be unimportant. His job entailed correcting and updating information about archaeological monuments as the OS maps were revised, and involved him undertaking much fieldwork, travelling across the British landscape to check the location of previously recorded sites and discover new ones. He began in Gloucestershire in late 1920, visiting 208 sites around the Cotswolds and adding 81 previously unknown barrows to the map. Based on his research in this region, in 1925 he published his book Long Barrows and the Stone Circles of the Cotswolds and the Welsh Marches.

As part of his job, he travelled around Britain, from Scotland in the north to the Scilly Isles in the south, often conducting his fieldwork by bicycle. At archaeological sites he took photographs and stored them in his archive, and he also obtained aerial photographs of archaeological sites taken by the Royal Air Force. In this he was aided by regional antiquarian societies and by his correspondents, whom he called his "ferrets". In 1921, the Ordnance Survey published Crawford's work, "Notes on Archaeology for Guidance in the Field", in which he explained how amateur archaeologists could identify traces of old monuments, roads, and agricultural activity in the landscape. He also began producing "period maps" in which archaeological sites were marked; the first of these was on Roman Britain, and featured Roman roads and settlements. First published in 1924, it soon sold out, resulting in a second edition in 1928. He followed this with a range of further maps in the 1930s: "England in the Seventeenth Century", "Celtic Earthworks of Salisbury Plain", "Neolithic Wessex", and "Britain in the Dark Ages". Although his position had initially been precarious, in 1926 it was made permanent, despite the reluctance of the Treasury, which financed the OS at the time. By 1938, he had been able to persuade the OS to employ an assistant, W. F. Grimes, to aid him in his work.

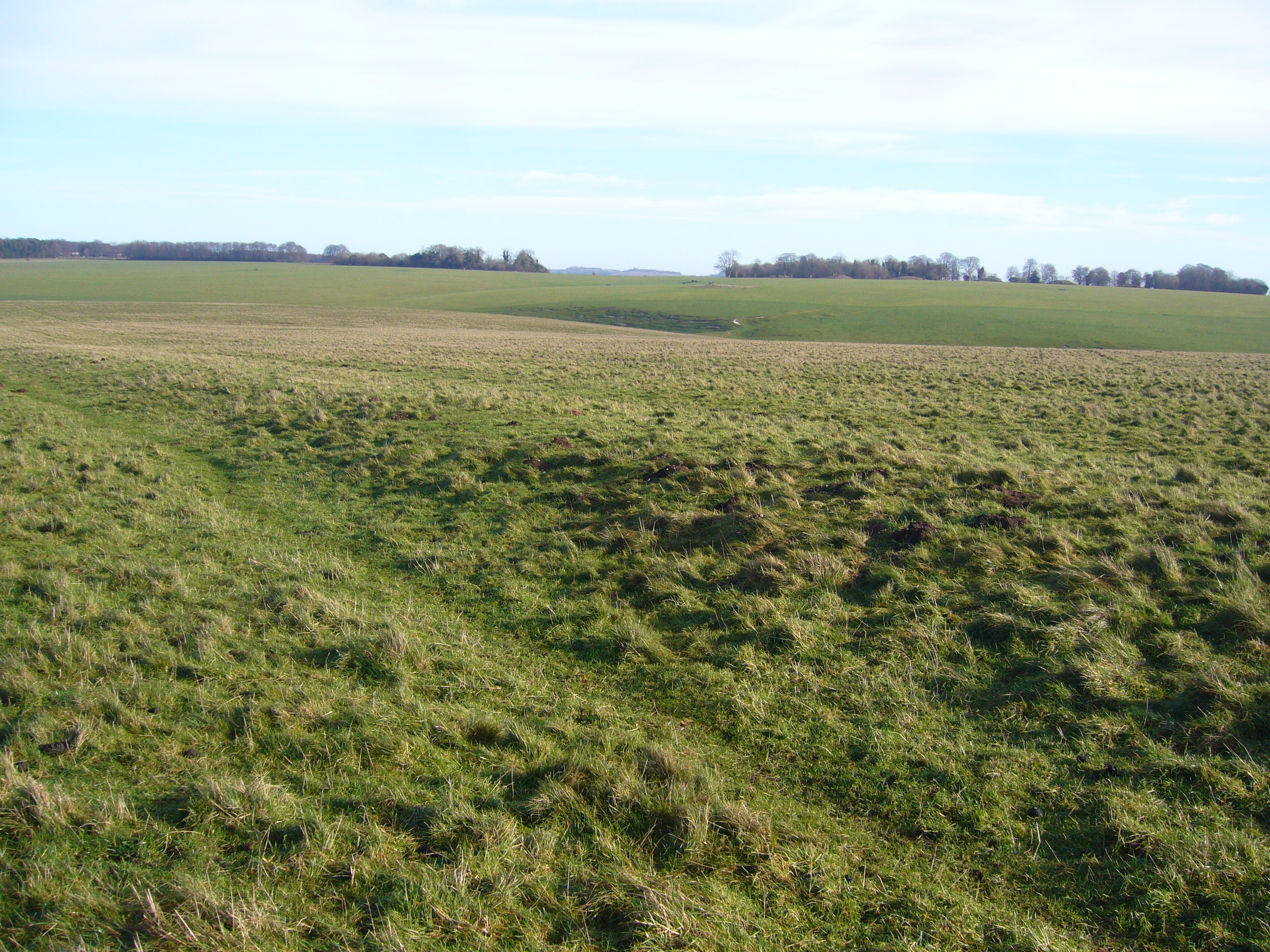
The Avenue at Stonehenge, looking NE towards Old and New King Barrows

Crawford became particularly interested in the new technique of aerial archaeology, claiming that this new process was to archaeology what the telescope was to astronomy. His association with it was honoured in Wells' 1939 novel The Shape of Things to Come, which names a survey aeroplane that discovers an ancient archaeological device "Crawford". He produced two OS leaflets containing various aerial photographs, printed in 1924 and 1929 respectively. Through these and other works he was keen to promote aerial archaeology, coming to be firmly identified with the technique. Crawford did not take these photographs himself, but collected them from RAF files and, in the 1930s, from flyers such as George Allen and Gilbert Insall.

Using RAF aerial photographs, Crawford determined the length of the Avenue at Stonehenge before embarking on an excavation of the site with A. D. Passmore in late 1923. This project attracted press attention, resulting in Crawford being contacted by the marmalade magnate and archaeologist Alexander Keiller. Keiller invited Crawford to join him in an aerial survey, financed by Keiller himself, in which they flew over Berkshire, Dorset, Hampshire, Somerset, and Wiltshire in 1924, taking photographs of archaeological traces in the landscape. Many of these images were published in Crawford and Keiller's Wessex from the Air in 1928. In 1927 Crawford and Keiller helped raise the finances to buy the land around Stonehenge and present it to The National Trust to prevent it from being damaged by further agricultural or urban development. Previously, in 1923, Crawford had assisted Keiller in campaigning to prevent a radio mast being erected on the archaeologically significant Windmill Hill in Wiltshire, with Keiller later purchasing the hill and the surrounding Avebury area. Despite this working relationship, the two never became friends, perhaps a result of their highly divergent opinions and interests outside of archaeology.

In 1927, Crawford founded Antiquity; A Quarterly Review of Archaeology, a quarterly journal designed to bring together the research of archaeologists working across the world to supplement the variety of regional antiquarian periodicals that were then available. In particular, Crawford saw Antiquity as a rival to the Antiquaries Journal published by the Society of Antiquaries. Crawford was contemptuous of the Society, disliking their neglect of prehistory and believing that they did little valuable research. Although designed to have an international scope, Antiquity exhibited a clear bias towards the archaeology of Britain, with its release coinciding with the blossoming of British archaeology as a field of study. It contained contributions from a variety of young archaeologists who came to dominate the field of British archaeology, among them V. Gordon Childe, Grahame Clark, Cyril Fox, Christopher Hawkes, T. D. Kendrick, Stuart Piggott, and Mortimer Wheeler. They shared Crawford's desire to professionalise the field, thereby taking it away from the domination of antiquarian hobbyists and in a more scientific direction. To some of these individuals, Crawford himself was affectionately known as "Ogs" or "Uncle Ogs"

The journal proved influential from the start. Although not initially using a process of peer review, Crawford asked his friends to read through submissions that he was unsure about. As well as seeking to shape and define the discipline, Antiquity sought to spread news of archaeological discoveries to a wider public, thereby being more accessible than pre-existing scholarly journals. This resulted in Crawford receiving letters from proponents of various pseudo-archaeological ideas, such as the ley line theory of Alfred Watkins; he filed these letters under a section of his archive titled "Crankeries" and was annoyed that educated people believed such ideas when they were demonstrably incorrect. He refused to publish an advert in Antiquity for The Old Straight Track by Watkins, who became very bitter towards him. In 1938, Crawford served as president of the Prehistoric Society; in this position he instigated a series of excavations, inviting the German archaeologist Gerhard Bersu—persecuted in Germany by the Nazi authorities—to move to England to oversee the excavation of Little Woodbury.

=== Foreign visits and Marxism ===
Above all [Crawford] has shown what can be done by a combination of intensive field-work with methodical revision and interpretation, to build up a fabric of scientific knowledge out of scattered and inexpert observations, and literally to "put upon the map" the outlines of British prehistory.

— John L. Myres, 1951

Crawford enjoyed foreign travel. In 1928 the OS sent him to the Middle East to collect aerial photographs that had been produced during the First World War and which were stored at Baghdad, Amman, and Heliopolis. In mid-1931 he visited Germany and Austria, furthering his interest in photography through the purchase of a Voigtländer camera. He later visited Italy with the intent of examining the possibility of producing OS maps pinpointing the country's archaeological sites; in November 1932 he met the Italian leader Benito Mussolini, who was interested in Crawford's ideas about creating an OS map of archaeological sites in Rome. This was part of a wider project to produce a series of maps covering the entirety of the Roman Empire, for which Crawford visited various parts of Europe during the late 1920s and 1930s. Holiday destinations included Germany, Austria, Romania, Corsica, Malta, Algeria, and Tunisia, and in 1936 he purchased a plot of land in Cyprus on which he had a house built. During these vacations, he visited archaeological sites and met with local archaeologists, encouraging them to contribute articles to Antiquity.

Crawford believed that society would progress with the growth of internationalism and the increased application of science. Politically, he had moved toward socialism under the influence of Childe, who had become a close friend. He expressed the view that socialism was "the natural corollary of science in the regulation of human affairs". He attempted to incorporate Marxist ideas into his archaeological interpretations, as a result producing articles such as "The Dialectical Process in the History of Science", which was published in The Sociological Review. He became enthusiastic about the Soviet Union, a state governed by the Marxist Communist Party, viewing it as the forerunner of a future world state.

With his friend Neil Hunter, he travelled to the Soviet Union in May 1932, sailing to Leningrad aboard the Smolny. Once there, they followed a prescribed tourist itinerary, visiting Moscow, Nizhni Novgorod, Stalingrad, Rostov-on-Don, Tiflis, Armenia, Batum, and Sukhum. Crawford admired what he perceived as the progress that the Soviet Union had made since the fall of the Tsarist regime, the increasingly classless and gender-equal status of its population, and the respect accorded to scientists in planning its societal development. He described his holiday with glowing praise in a book, A Tour of Bolshevy, stating that he did so to "hasten the downfall of capitalism" while at the same time making "as much money as possible" out of capitalists. The book was rejected by the publisher Victor Gollancz, after which Crawford decided not to approach other publishers, instead giving typed copies of the work to his friends. Although he became involved with the Friends of the Soviet Union and wrote several articles for the Daily Worker newspaper, he never joined the Communist Party of Great Britain, nor did he become involved in organised politics at all, perhaps fearing that to do so would jeopardise his employment in the civil service.

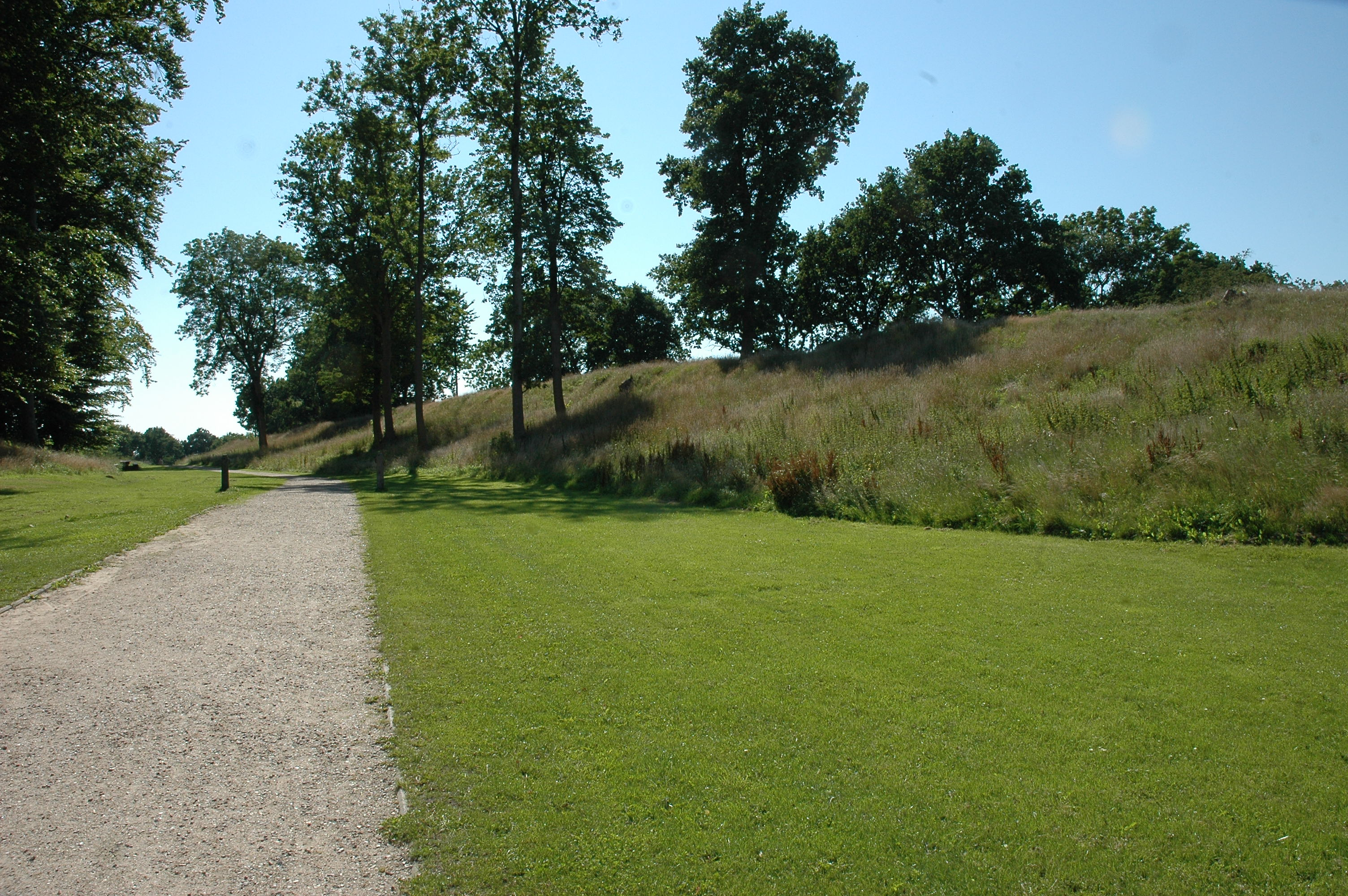
In 1938, Crawford was guided around the Danevirke earthen barrier by German archaeologists.

In Britain, he photographed sites associated with the prominent Marxists Karl Marx and Vladimir Lenin. He also photographed the signs erected by landowners and religious groups, believing that in doing so he was documenting the traces of capitalist society before they would be swept away by socialism. Both in Britain and on a visit to Germany he photographed pro-fascist and anti-fascist propaganda and graffiti. Like many leftists at the time, he believed that fascism was a temporary, extreme expression of capitalist society that would soon be overcome by socialism. He nevertheless expressed admiration for the German archaeological establishment under the Nazi government, highlighting that the British state lagged far behind in terms of funding excavations and encouraging the study of archaeology in universities; he refrained from commenting on the political agenda that the Nazis had in promoting archaeology.

Despite his socialist and pro-Soviet beliefs, Crawford believed in collaborating with all foreign archaeologists, regardless of political or ideological differences. In early 1938, he lectured on aerial archaeology at the German Air Ministry; the Ministry published his lecture as Luftbild und Vorgeschichte, and Crawford was frustrated that the British government did not publish his work with the same enthusiasm. From there, he visited Vienna to meet with his friend, the archaeologist Oswald Menghin; Menghin took Crawford to an event celebrating the Anschluss, at which he met the prominent Nazi Josef Bürckel. Shortly after, he holidayed in Schleswig-Holstein, where German archaeologists took him to see the Danevirke.

In 1939, Crawford was involved in photographing the excavation of the Sutton Hoo Anglo-Saxon ship burial in Suffolk. He was present on the site from 24 to 29 July 1939, and took 124 photographs. Several of his photographs are used in the British Museum's display of Sutton Hoo artefacts, but he was not originally credited; this may be due to the lack of recognition for certain types of archaeological labour, such as photography. His photographs recorded the excavation process as well artefacts recovered during the dig, such as the Anastasius Dish. A photographic record of an archaeological excavation was novel at the time.

In the late 1930s he began work on a book titled Bloody Old Britain, (Note: The title Bloody Old Britain, used by Crawford for his unpublished book about material culture in 1930s Britain, would later be used by Kitty Hauser for her 2008 biography of Crawford. Although they have the same title, these are distinct books.) which he described as "an attempt to apply archaeological methods to the study of contemporary society" and in which he was heavily critical of his homeland. It examined 1930s Britain through its material culture, with Crawford reaching the judgement that it was a society in which appearances were given greater importance than value, with clothing, for instance, emphasising bourgeois respectability over comfort. He attributed much of this to the impact of capitalism and consumerism on British culture. The work fitted within an established genre of 1930s publications which lamented the state of British society, in particular the quality of its food and manufactured products as well as its increasing suburbanisation. By the outbreak of the Second World War the work had become less marketable due to its unpatriotic nature, and when in 1943 Crawford proposed it to Methuen Publishing they turned it down; he gave copies to a few friends, but never published it.

=== Second World War ===
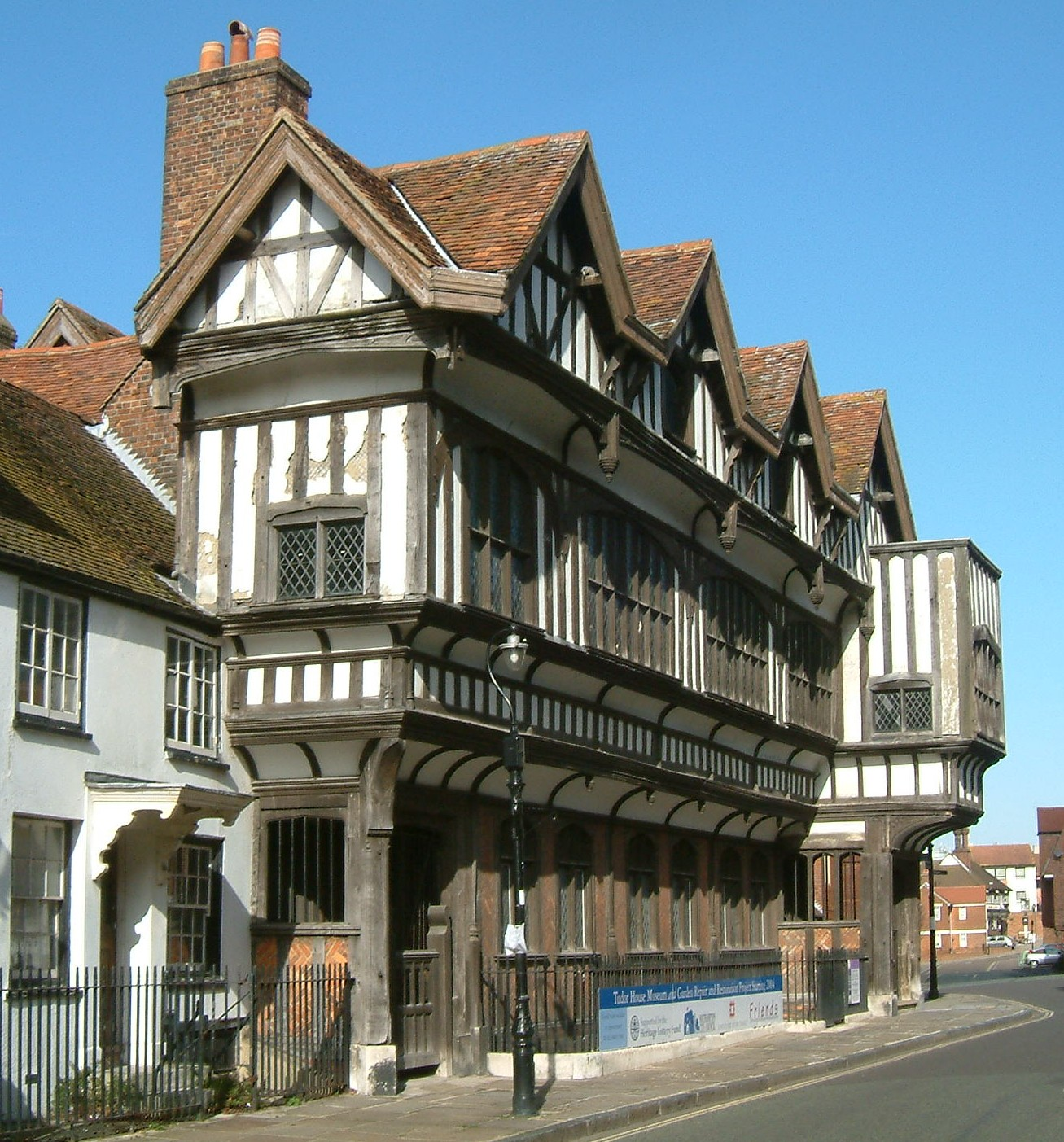
Crawford developed an interest in the historical architecture of Southampton, which includes this 16th century building.

In anticipation of the Second World War, Crawford expressed the view that he would "remain neutral" and not take sides, not because he favoured fascism over liberal democracy but because he saw both as repugnant forms of capitalist society which would ultimately be swept away by a socialist revolution; in his words the war would be "a clash of imperialisms, a gangsters' feud". After war broke out, he decided that in the event of a German invasion of Britain he would destroy all of his leftist literature lest he be persecuted for possessing it.

In November 1940, the German Luftwaffe began bombing Southampton, where the OS offices were located. Crawford removed some of the old OS maps and stored them in the garage of his house at Nursling, while also unsuccessfully urging the Director-General to remove the OS' archive of books, documents, maps and photographs to a secure location. Subsequently, the OS headquarters were destroyed in the bombing, resulting in the loss of most of their archive. The refusal of the OS administration to take his warnings seriously infuriated Crawford, exacerbating his anger about the civil service's red tape and bureaucracy. In his words, "trying to get a move on in the Civil Service was like trying to swim in a lake of glue". Resigning his membership in various British societies, he unsuccessfully tried to find employment abroad.

With little for an archaeology officer to do at the OS in wartime, in mid-1941 Crawford was seconded to the Royal Commission on the Historical Monuments of England "for special duties during wartime". They assigned him to carry out a project of photographic documentation in Southampton for the National Buildings Record, producing images of many old buildings or architectural features that were threatened by the Luftwaffe's bombing campaign. He appreciated the value of this work, taking 5,000 photographs over the course of the war. In 1944, the Council for British Archaeology was founded, and while Crawford was invited to serve on its first council, he declined the offer, being lukewarm about the project.

== Later life: 1946–1957 ==
In 1946, at the earliest possible opportunity, Crawford resigned his post at the OS, where he was replaced by Charles Philips. He remained in the Southampton area and retained his interest in the city's architecture, in particular that of the Middle Ages. In 1946 he was a founding member of a lobby group, Friends of Old Southampton, which sought to protect the city's historic architecture from destruction amid post-war development. During the post-war period he also came to be preoccupied and terrified by the prospect of a nuclear war, urging archaeological authorities to make copies of all their information and disperse it in different locations to ensure that knowledge survived any forthcoming Third World War. Retaining his left-wing interests, in 1945 and 1946 he had some involvement with the Labour Party, although elsewhere he mocked the "ignorant" who thought that Labour "genuinely" represented socialism. In the latter part of the 1940s he became increasingly disillusioned with the Soviet Union after reading Arthur Koestler's Darkness at Noon, a book about Joseph Stalin's Great Purge and Moscow show trials, as well as learning of how Soviet scientists who did not support the ideas of Trofim Lysenko had been persecuted. In 1950—after reading the memoir of Margarete Buber-Neumann—he declared himself to be "fanatically anti-Soviet [and] anti-communist".

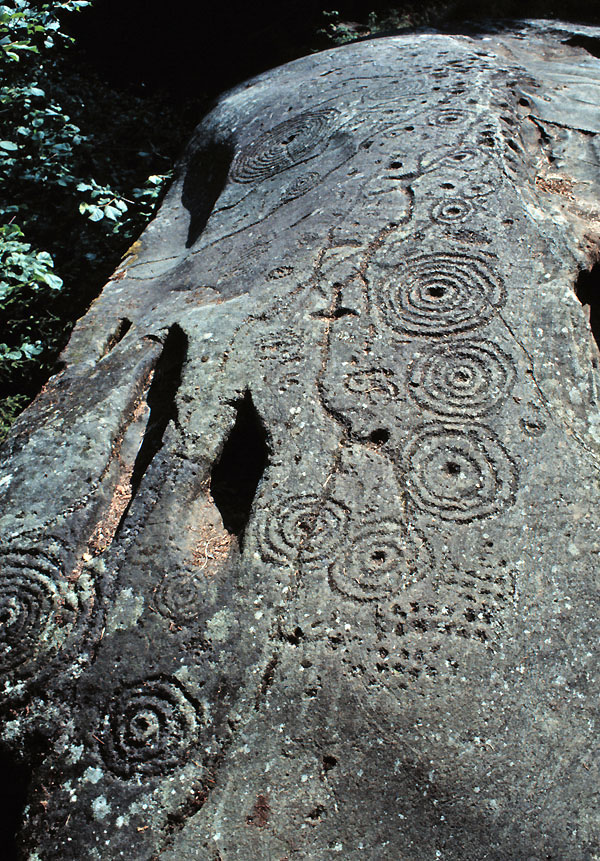
In The Eye Goddess, Crawford argued that the Neolithic concentric circles found in Europe represented the eye of a goddess.

In 1949, Crawford was elected a Fellow of the British Academy, and in 1950 he became a Commander of the Most Excellent Order of the British Empire. In 1952 he was made an honorary Doctor of Letters by the University of Cambridge for his contributions to aerial archaeology.

Crawford returned his attention to Sudanese archaeology, describing Sudan as "an escape-land of the mind at a time when the island of Britain was an austere prison". At the invitation of the Sudanese government, he visited the country on an archaeological reconnaissance trip in January 1950, before visiting the Middle Nile in 1951. At Nursling, he wrote a book on the northern Sudanese Funj Sultanate of Sennar, which appeared in the same year as his long-delayed report on the Abu Geili excavation, co-written with Frank Addison. He followed this with the 1953 book Castles and Churches in the Middle Nile Region. Another of Crawford's book projects in this period was a short history of Nursling, as well as an introductory guide to landscape studies, Archaeology in the Field, published in 1953. In 1955 he published his autobiography, Said and Done, which the archaeologist Glyn Daniel and the historian Mark Pottle—the authors of Crawford's entry in the Dictionary of National Biography—described as "a vivacious and amusing autobiography in which his character comes clearly through".

After the discovery of prehistoric rock art on Stonehenge in 1953, Crawford decided to examine the engravings on the megalithic monuments in Brittany. Inspired by this subject, in 1957 he published The Eye Goddess. In this book he argued that many of the abstract designs featured in prehistoric rock art were representations of eyes. He further argued that they provided evidence for a religion devoted to a mother goddess which had existed across the Old World from the Palaeolithic through to the period of Christianisation. That same decade also witnessed similar ideas regarding a Neolithic religion focused around a great goddess being espoused in the works of Childe and Daniel; the historian Ronald Hutton later observed that "whether or not there was ever an 'Age of the Goddess' in Neolithic Europe, there certainly was one among European intellectuals in the mid twentieth century". Crawford's book was not well received within academia.

Crawford was also interested in cats, and learned how to mimic cat noises, performing these on a BBC broadcast, "The Language of Cats", which proved popular and led to a range of fan letters. A publisher in the United States invited him to write a book on the subject, but Crawford never completed it. In the mid-1950s, Crawford began to take an interest in astronomy and cosmological ideas about the origin of the universe, favouring Fred Hoyle's steady state theory about an eternal universe with no beginning or end.

Crawford's gravestone in St Boniface's churchyard, Nursling, near Southampton

In 1951, an edited volume, Aspects of Archaeology in Britain and Beyond: Essays Presented to O. G. S. Crawford, was published, having been edited by Grimes and brought out to mark Crawford's 65th birthday. Reviewing the anthology for Antiquity, J. v. d. Waals and R. J. Forbes described it as "an exquisite birthday present". Many of Crawford's associates worried about him, aware that he lived alone at his cottage in Nursling—with only the company of his elderly housekeeper and cats—and that he lacked either a car or telephone. It was there that he died in his sleep on the night of 28–29 November 1957. He had arranged for some of his letters and books to be destroyed, while others were to be sent to the Bodleian Library, with the proviso that some of them would not be opened until the year 2000. His body was buried in the church graveyard at Nursling. In accordance with his instructions, the title "Editor of Antiquity" was inscribed on his gravestone, reflecting his desire to be remembered primarily as an archaeologist. On Crawford's death, the editorship of Antiquity was taken on by Daniel.

== Personality ==
Let it be recorded in letters of brass that here was no mere spirit of mischief, no subliminal grievance seeking outlet. Crawford's overriding quality was a complete integrity which robbed his passion and his prejudice of all poison, even when (as on occasion) it seemed to some of us least apt. His directness, let us call it, was a facet of that vital integrity.

— Mortimer Wheeler, 1958

Crawford's socialist beliefs were known to his colleagues and associates, as was his antipathy toward religion. While he became an atheist during his time at Marlborough College, it is not known exactly when he embraced socialism. He placed a strong emphasis on personal self-sufficiency, and openly expressed contempt for those who required social interaction for their own happiness. His adult life was a solitary one, with no family and no human dependents. His sexual orientation remains unknown, with Bowden noting that Crawford's interactions with women were "cordial but not significant". He was fond of cats, and kept several as pets, also rearing pigs for food as well as growing vegetables in his garden at Nursing. A heavy smoker, he was known for rolling his own cigarettes.

Crawford was often irritable and some colleagues found him exasperating to work with. He was known for his lack of patience, and when angry or frustrated was known to fling his hat to the floor in a gesture of rage. His biographer Kitty Hauser noted that "apparently trifling events left an indelible mark on him", for he would remember a perceived slight for decades. Bowden expressed the view that while Crawford "had a quick temper, which he strove to control ... he was essentially a friendly man", adding that he could be "clubbable, hospitable and kind".

Jonathan Glancey referred to Crawford as "a compelling if decidedly cantankerous anti-hero" and an "essentially Victorian eccentric". Hauser characterised him as "a very British combination of a snob and a rebel", also noting that he was "no great intellectual". Similarly, Clark expressed the view that "Crawford's achievements" stemmed from his "moral integrity and singleness of mind" rather than "any outstanding intellectual brilliance". The journalist Neal Ascherson described Crawford as "not conventionally intellectual". Ascherson added that Crawford was "withdrawn, generally ill at ease with other members of the human species except on paper, and suspicious of personal celebrity", in this way contrasting Crawford with his "gregarious" contemporaries Wheeler and Daniel.

He had a habit, disconcerting to some people, of judging others, however distinguished by rank, wealth, abilities, or official position, solely according to what they put into archaeology. From such a judgement there can be no doubt how Crawford himself emerges. Before he died he had become in very fact a kind of uncle to British Archaeology.

— Grahame Clark, 1958

Daniel characterised Crawford as having a "messianic desire" to promote archaeology "to the people of the world". He was opinionated and dogmatic and expressed disdain for those who viewed the past in a different manner to himself. Piggott noted that Crawford was unable to sympathise with the perspectives of those studying past societies through a discipline other than archaeology, such as history or art history, and that he could not sympathise with "anyone not as passionately concerned as himself in field antiquities". For example, in one of his publications, Crawford dismissed historians as being "bookish" and "clean-booted". The archaeologist Jacquetta Hawkes commented that in Crawford's editorials for Antiquity, he directed "righteous indignation" toward "everybody from the State, Dominion and Colonial Governments, Universities and Museums, to tardy reviewers and careless proof-correctors".

Wheeler—who considered Crawford to be "one of [his] closest friends"—claimed that the latter was "an outspoken and uncompromising opponent" and a man who had a "boyish glee in calling the bluff of convention". He added that Crawford exhibited the "divine impatience of the pioneer" and that he had an "inability to work in harness. If he joined a committee or a sodality, he did so only to resign at the first opportunity." Piggott described Crawford as a mentor who "was encouraging, helpful, and unconventional: his racy outspoken criticism of what then passed for the archaeological Establishment was music to a schoolboy's ear".

== Reception and legacy ==
Crawford was much respected by his peers. According to Hauser, at the time of his death Crawford had "acquired an almost mythical status among British archaeologists as the uncompromising – if eccentric – progenitor of them all". In 1999, the archaeologist John Charlton referred to Crawford as "one of the pioneers of British archaeology this century", while nine years later Ascherson described him as "beyond question one of the great figures of the 'modern' generation which transformed British archaeological practice and its institutions between 1918 and – say – 1955". Ascherson noted that Crawford's contributions to archaeology had little to do with archaeological theory and more to do with "the institutions and tools ... which he bequeathed to his profession", including Antiquity. Crawford devoted little time to interpreting the archaeological record, and when he did so usually embraced functionalist interpretations, believing that people in traditional societies devoted almost all of their time to survival rather than behaving according to religious or symbolic concepts; in this he was typical of his time and was influenced by Marxist materialism.

When the history of British Archaeology comes to be written, it is safe to say that the name of O. G. S. Crawford will bulk more largely than the record of his own substantial achievements in research. He is likely to be remembered both as an innovator and even more for the stimulus he gave to others.

— Grahame Clark, 1951

Crawford was recognised for his contributions to bringing archaeology to a wide sector of the British public. The archaeologist Caroline Malone stated that many viewed Crawford as "an 'amateur's' archaeologist, providing the means to publish and comment outside the restrictions of local journals and to offer a vision of a new and universal discipline". Clark expressed the view that Crawford "always hankered to restore the flesh and blood and to make the past a reality to the living generation", and in doing so helped to attract a greater public audience for British archaeology than many of his colleagues. Wheeler remarked that "he was our greatest archaeological publicist; he taught the world about scholarship, and scholars about one another". Commenting on Crawford's editorship of Antiquity, Hawkes expressed the view that his "skill in steering between over-simplification and over-specialization has enabled the Magazine to succeed admirably in its role as go-between for experts and public".

Crawford's system of documenting archaeological sites in the OS' Archaeological Record provided the blueprint on which both the later National Archaeological Records in England, Scotland, and Wales, and the local sites and monuments records were based. In the 21st century, Crawford's photographic archive stored at Oxford University's Institute of Archaeology was still consulted by archaeologists seeking to view how various sites appeared during the first half of the 20th century. In 2008, Kitty Hauser's biography, Bloody Old Britain, was published. Reviewing her work for The Guardian, Glancey described it as "a truly fascinating and unexpected book". Writing in Public Archaeology, Ascherson characterised it as "full of clever perception and sympathetic insight" but was critical of its lack of references and "occasional mistakes of fact".

== Bibliography ==
An anonymously assembled list of Crawford's publications up to 1948 was published in his 1951 festschrift.

Year of publication	Title	Co-author(s)	Publisher
1921	Man and his Past	–	Oxford University Press
1922	Notes on Archaeology for Guidance in the Field	–	Ordnance Survey Office
1922	The Long Barrows and Stone Circles in the Area Covered by Sheet 8 of the 1/4 Inch Map (The Cotswolds and the Welsh Marches)	–	Ordnance Survey Office
1922	The Andover District	–	Oxford University Press
1924	Air Survey and Archaeology	–	Ordnance Survey
1924	The Long Barrows and Stone Circles in the Area Covered by Sheet 12 of the 1/4 Inch Map (Kent, Surrey and Sussex)	–	Ordnance Survey
1924	Map of Roman Britain	–	Ordnance Survey
1925	The Long Barrows of the Cotswolds	–	Bellows
1928	Wessex from the Air	Alexander Keiller	Oxford University Press
1932	Map of Neolithic Wessex	–	Ordnance Survey
1934	Celtic Earthworks of Salisbury Plain: Old Sarum Sheet	–	Ordnance Survey
1935	Map of Britain in the Dark Ages (South Sheet)	–	Ordnance Survey
1937	The Strip-Map of Litlington	–	Ordnance Survey
1938	Map of Britain in the Dark Ages (North Sheet)	–	Ordnance Survey
1948	The Topography of Roman Scotland North of the Antonine Wall	–	Cambridge University Press
1948	A Short History of Nursling	–	Warren and Sons
1951	The Fung Kingdom of Sennar: With a Geographical Account of the Middle Nile Region	–	Bellows
1951	Abu Geili	F. Addison	Oxford University Press for the Wellcombe Trust
1953	Archaeology in the Field	–	Frederick A. Praeger
1953	Castles and Churches in the Middle Nile Region	–	Sudan Antiquities Service
1955	Said and Done: The Autobiography of an Archaeologist	–	Weidenfeld and Nicolson
1957	The Eye Goddess	–	Phoenix House
1958	Ethiopian Itineraries, Circa 1400–1524: Including Those Collected by Alessandro Zorzi at Venice in the Years 1519–1524 (editor)	–	Cambridge University Press for the Hakluyt Society

Academic offices
Preceded by Founder	Editor of Antiquity; 1927–1957	Succeeded by Glyn Daniel
