= Little Woodbury =

Archaeological site in Wiltshire, England

Coordinates: 51.0503°N 1.7888°W

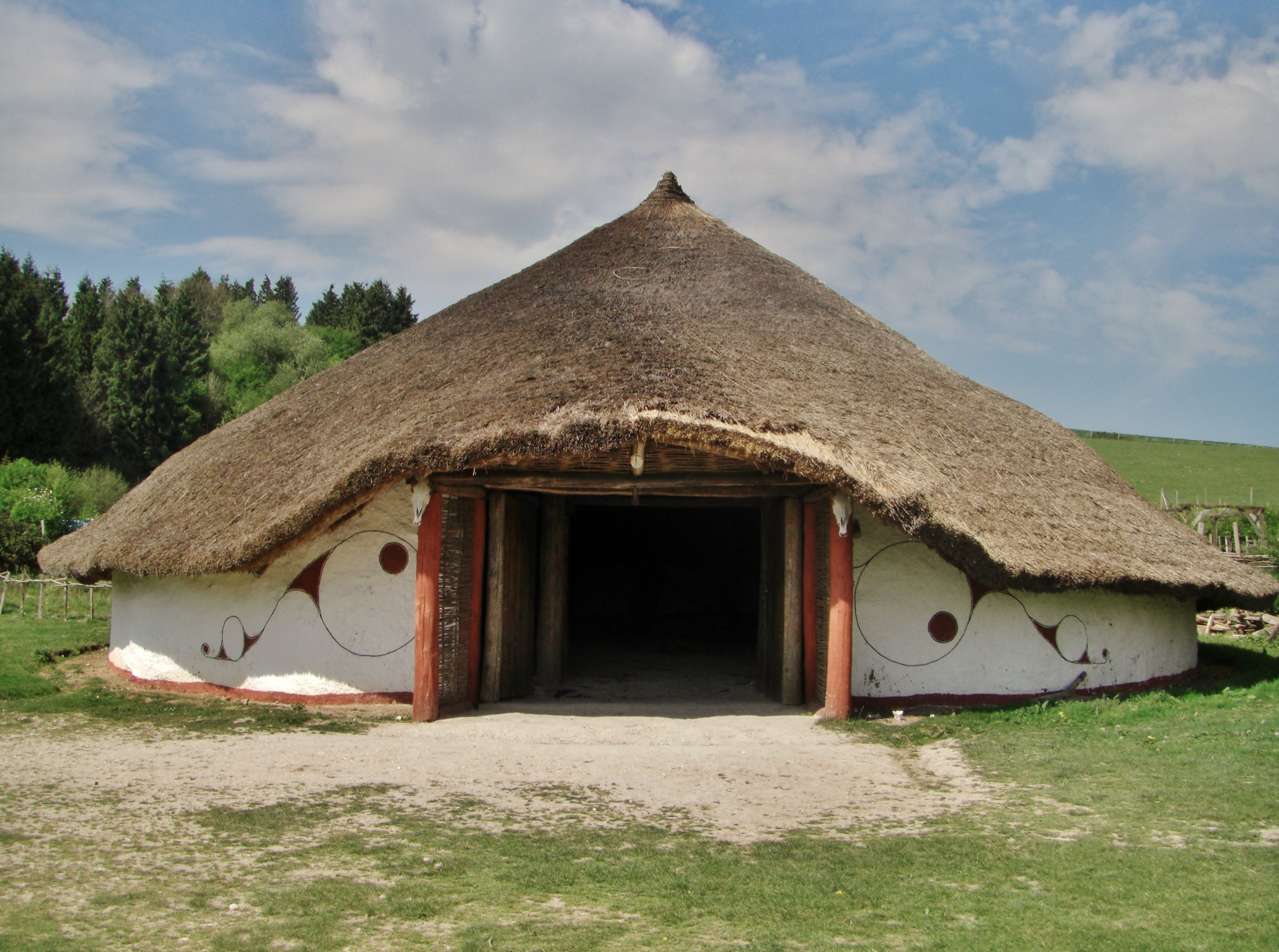
A reconstructed roundhouse from Little Woodbury at Butser Ancient Farm

Little Woodbury is the name of an Iron Age archaeological site in Britford parish, near Salisbury in the English county of Wiltshire. The site, which is just north of Salisbury District Hospital, is a scheduled monument.

The site lies about 1 1/4 miles (2.0 km) south of the centre of Salisbury and 1 mile (1.6 km) north of Odstock village, at grid reference SU149279. It was partially excavated in 1938 and 1939 by Gerhard Bersu. In excavations like Little Woodbury he introduced the revolutionary approaches in the excavation of settlements (e.g. the identification of timber post remains) developed in continental Europe during previous decades.

== Discovery and excavation ==
Gerhard Bersu, a German archaeologist who had been driven to Britain following discrimination by the Nazis, was commissioned in 1938 by the Prehistoric Society to excavate the site in order to improve knowledge of early British settlement sites, which were until then poorly understood. A settlement had been identified at the site through aerial archaeology by O.G.S. Crawford almost twenty years previously, when he had seen a circular enclosure as a cropmark.

Bersu worked at the site from 12 June to 18 September 1938, and 12 June to 19 July 1939. He dug a network of 4-5m wide parallel trenches, one after the other, across the site. By this method he was able to identify a large roundhouse and several other domestic features such as corn-drying frames, granaries, and storage pits. The postholes of the roundhouse enabled Bersu to argue that these structures were the common domestic building type of the Iron Age; prior to his work it was thought that people lived in clusters of pit-dwellings in the ground.

Through Bersu's identification of animal bone and cereal grains, he convinced other archaeologists to re-evaluate the large holes they had found as storage pits. Though he only excavated around 190 pits, Bersu estimated that there were roughly 360 more unexcavated ones further underground. He posited that since the storage pits could only be used for a limited amount of time before pests and putrefaction set in, they were often replaced by new pits, with only around 12 being open at a time. Stratified layers of loose chalk, humus-soil, burnt and unburnt flints, small potsherds, bones, and powdered ash showed evidence of the pits being refilled as soon as new pits were dug.

During his identification of timber post remains, Bersu was able to assemble a ground-plan of the main roundhouse. It was composed of four elements: two outer rings of post-holes (with a max diameter of 15 m), another concentric ring of post-holes (1.5-2 m further in), a group of posts in a square formation (4 m from the inner ring), and a gap (3 m wide) in the east side of the two outer rings marking the entrance. However, Bersu had difficulty deciding what the configuration of a reconstruction would look like.

When war broke out in 1939, work stopped and Bersu was interned on the Isle of Man. He never returned to the site and post-excavation work was never fully completed. Regardless, Bersu's discoveries inspired excavations like West Harling and Itford Hill when it came to the identification of Iron Age settlements.

== Roundhouse reconstruction ==
In 2008, a recreation of the roundhouse was built at the Butser Ancient Farm open-air museum in Hampshire.
