= Norwegian Archaeological Expedition to Easter Island =

The Norwegian Archaeological Expedition to Easter Island occurred in 1955, and was led by Thor Heyerdahl. For the trip, he converted a 150-foot Greenland trawler into an expedition ship. Heyerdahl did not fare well in the scholarly press after his return.
