= Basil Megaw =

British archaeologist

Basil Richardson Stanley Megaw FSA Scot FRSE FMA (22 June 1913 – 22 August 2002) was a British archaeologist. He was the first Director of the School of Scottish Studies at Edinburgh.

== Life ==
He was born on 22 June 1913 in Belfast the son of Arthur S. Megaw and his wife, Helen Bertha Smith. He was educated at Mourne Grange then Campbell College in Belfast. He then obtained a place at Peterhouse, Cambridge where he graduated BA in Archaeology and Anthropology in 1935. His brothers Eric Megaw and Peter Megaw were also notable in their fields.

He joined the Manx Museum in 1936 as assistant director and in 1940 he replaced William Cubbon as Director, holding this post from 1947 to 1957.

In 1940 he was also appointed an Inspector of Ancient Monuments in England but could not take on this role due to the Second World War. He instead became a Scientific Officer for RAF Bomber Command.

From 1957 to 1969 he was Director of the School of Scottish Studies being replaced in 1969 by Prof John MacQueen (1929–2019).

In 1966 he was elected a Fellow of the Royal Society of Edinburgh. His proposers were Douglas Allan, Wreford Watson, Alexander Charles Stephen and Douglas Guthrie.

From 1974 to 1977 he was Vice President of the Society of Antiquaries of Scotland.

He retired fully in 1980 and died in Stevenage on 22 August 2002.

== Family ==
He was married to Eleanor Hardy (d.1977). They had two children, Sam and Helen.
