= Rapa Nui National Park =

World Heritage Site in Easter Island

Coordinates: 27.15°S 109.45°W

- IUCN category II (national park)
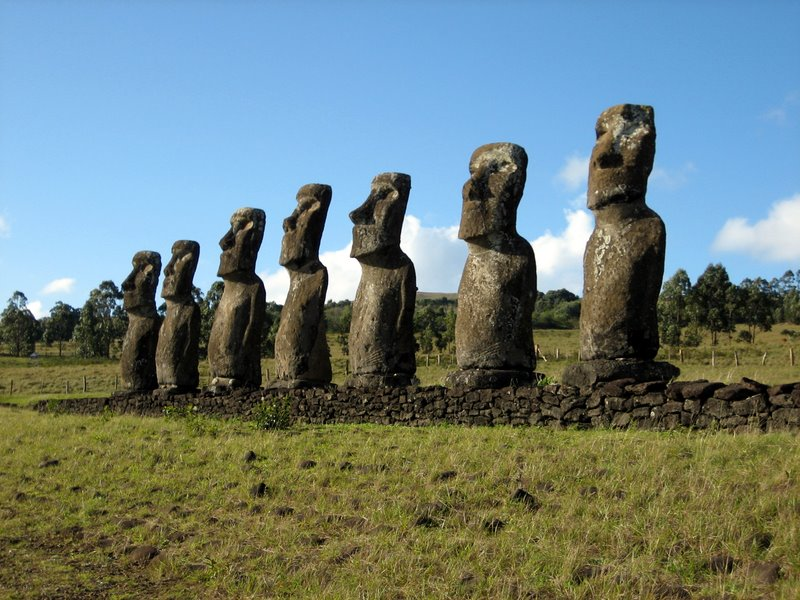
- Ahu Akivi moai that face the ocean
- Interactive map of Rapa Nui National Park
- Location: Easter Island, Chile
- Nearest city: Hanga Roa
- Area: 6,800 hectares (17,000 acres)
- Established: 1935
- Visitors: 52,202 (in 2012)
- Governing body: Ma'u Henua Indigenous Community

UNESCO World Heritage Site
- Type: Cultural
- Criteria: i, iii, v
- Designated: 1995 (19th session)
- Reference no.: 715
- Region: Latin America and the Caribbean

Rapa Nui National Park (Spanish: Parque nacional Rapa Nui) is a national park and UNESCO World Heritage Site located on Easter Island, Chile. Rapa Nui is the Polynesian name of Easter Island; its Spanish name is Isla de Pascua. The island is located in the southeastern Pacific Ocean, at the southeastern extremity of the Polynesian Triangle. The island was taken over by Chile in 1888. Its fame and World Heritage status arise from the 887 extant stone statues known by the name "moai", whose creation is attributed to the early Rapa Nui people who inhabited the island starting between 300 and 1200 AD. Much of the island has been declared as Rapa Nui National Park which, on 22 March 1996, UNESCO designated a World Heritage Site under cultural criteria (i), (iii), & (v). Rapa Nui National Park is now under the administrative control of the Ma´u Henua Polynesian Indigenous Community, which is the first autonomous institute on the island. The indigenous Rapa Nui people have regained authority over their ancestral lands and are in charge of the management, preservation and protection of their patrimony. On the first of December 2017, President Michelle Bachelet returned ancestral lands in the form of the Rapa Nui National Park to the indigenous people. For the first time in history, the revenue generated by the National Park is invested in the island and used to conserve the natural heritage.

== Geography ==
Rapa Nui, showing the three main volcanoes Terevaka, Poike, Rano Kau, as well as Anakena beach, the islets including Motu Nui. Modern Hanga Roa and Mataveri International Airport, the ruins at Orongo and the quarry at Rano Raraku. It marks major ahus with moai.

Geographically isolated, the island forms the eastern geographic and cultural boundary of Polynesia. It is 3,700 kilometres (2,300 mi) west of Chile, about 2,200 km (1,400 mi) east of Pitcairn Island (the nearest human habitat) and is the most remote inhabited spot on Earth. The park is triangular in shape and has a length of 23 km (14 mi) and a width of 11 km (6.8 mi). It is home to an extinct megalithic culture which is seen in the form of edifices of huge statues called "moai" made out of volcanic rocks. The topography includes volcanoes and a rugged coastline. Its elevation varies from sea level to 300 m (980 ft). It has fresh water lakes, volcanic craters and a coastline which is subject to erosion.

=== Climate ===
The park experiences a warm sub-tropical climate with southeast trade winds from October to April. The annual average rainfall is 1,250 millimetres (49 in), with rains occurring during the winter season. The average temperature varies from 19 °C (66 °F) in winter to 24 °C (75 °F) in summer.

== History ==
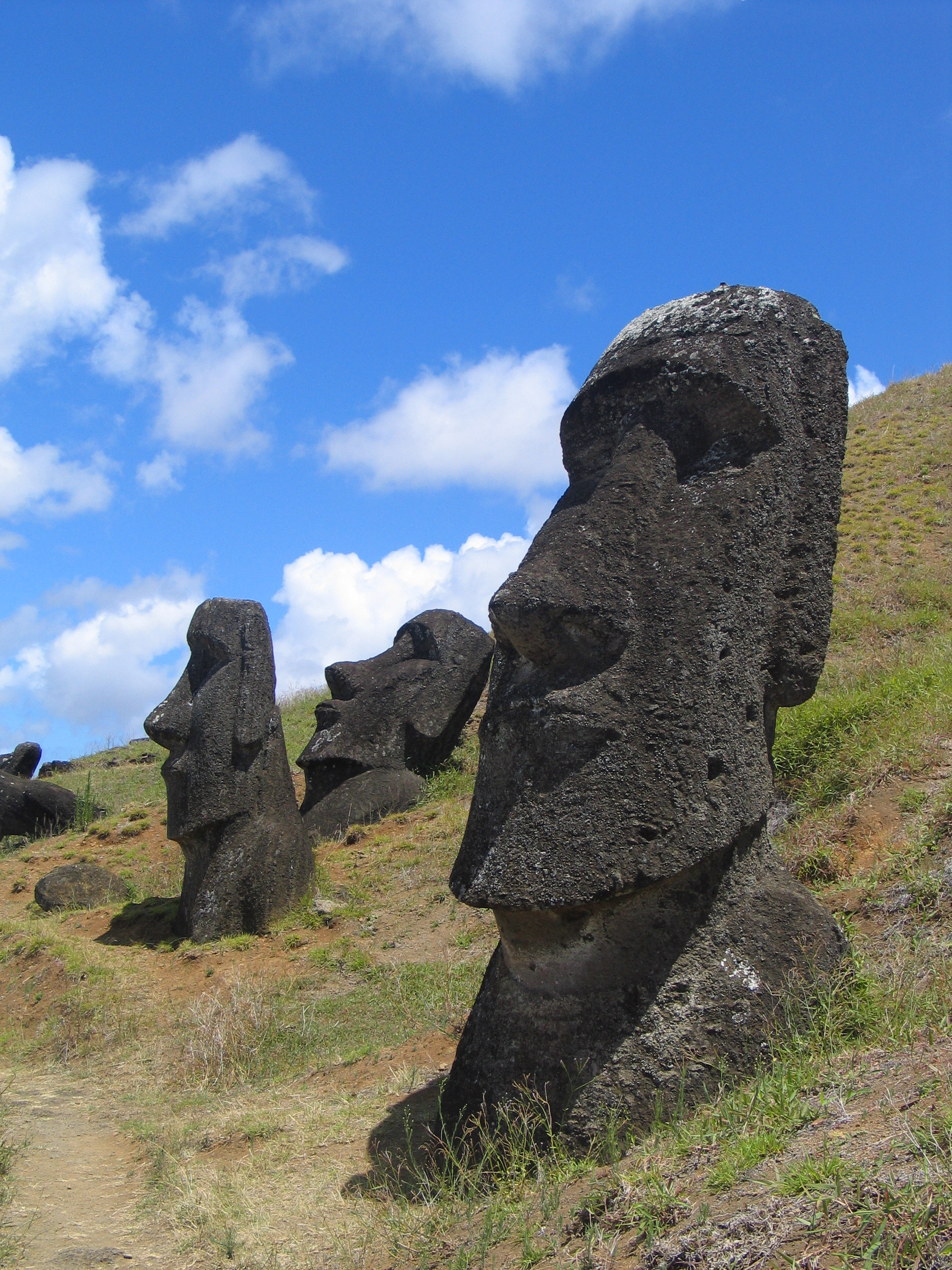
Moai at Rano Raraku, Easter Island.

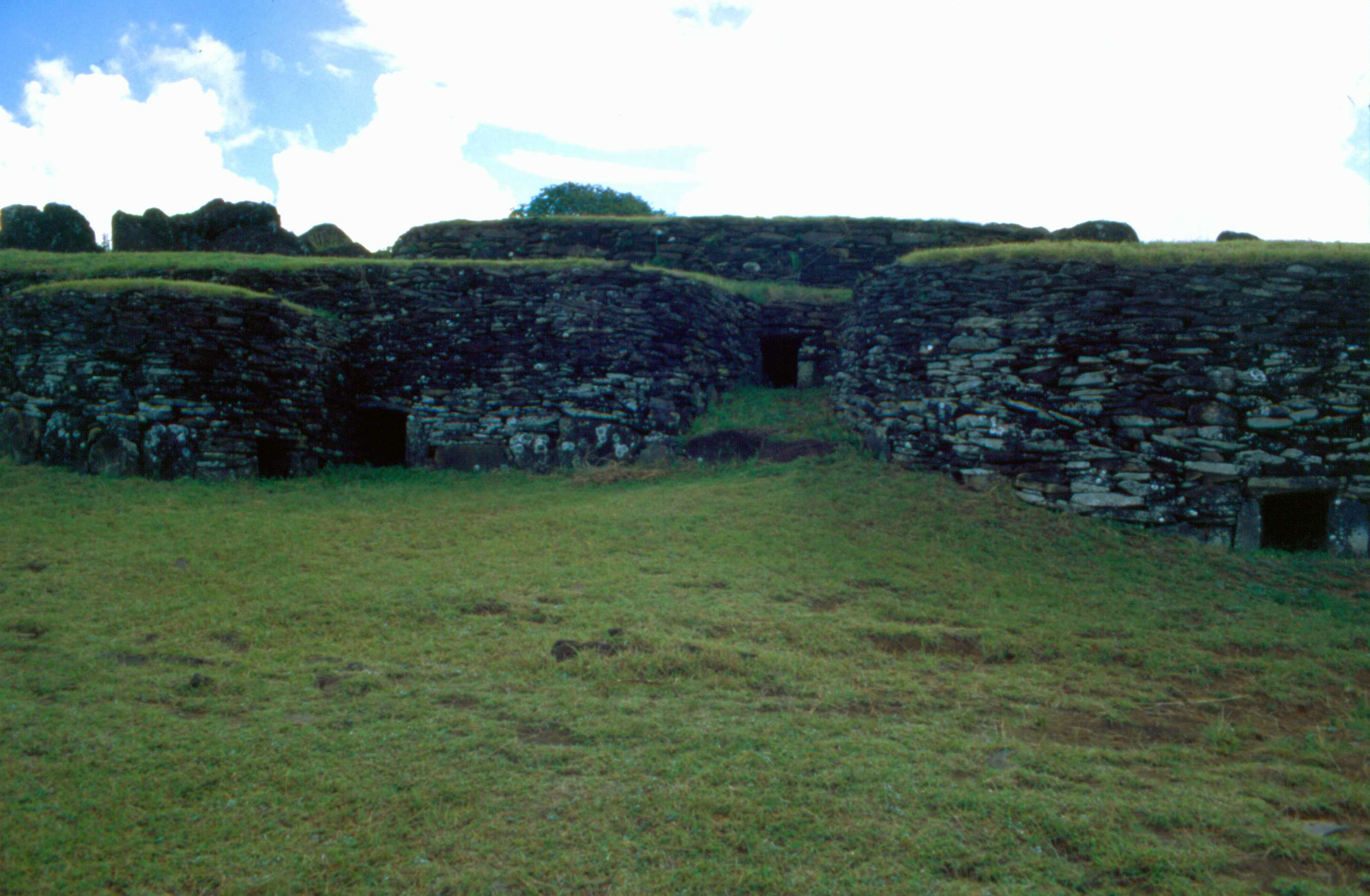
Restored stone houses at Orongo

The Rapa Nui people settled the island some time between 300 and 1200 CE. The park was created by the Chilean Government in 1935. The native people were confined to a reserve area just outside the capital city of Hanga Roa and the rest of the land was leased to sheep ranchers. The movement for independence was started in 1964 and following this the lease for sheep farming was terminated during the 1980s and the entire island was declared a historic park. The population of the island which was 2,770 in 1972 rose to 3,792 by 2002, mostly concentrated in the capital.

Between 1972 and 2015 the Rapa Nui National Park was administered by the CONAF (National Forest Corporation), during 2016 it was co-administered between the state agency and the Ma'u Henua community, in 2017 the administration of the park was granted to the indigenous community for 50 renewable years.

The island was brought under the administrative control of Chile in 1888. Its fame and World Heritage status arise from the 887 extant stone statues known as "moai". Much of the island has been included in the Rapa Nui National Park. On 22 March 1996 UNESCO designated it a World Heritage Site of cultural significance under criteria (i), (iii), & (v).

In October 2022, a forest fire swept through the park whilst causing “irreparable” damage to wetlands and the moai statues within the archaeological site.

== Culture ==
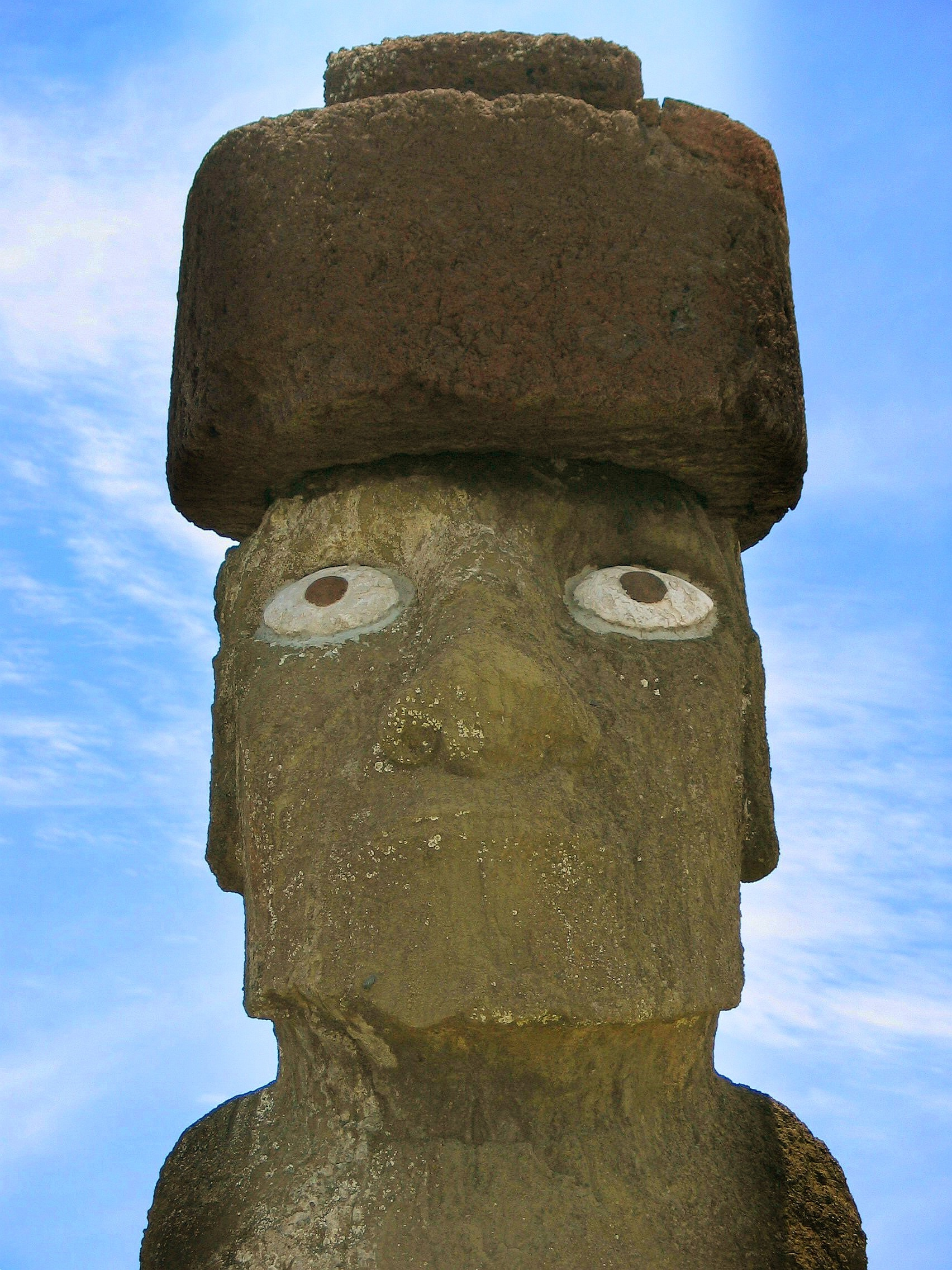
The moai with headgear at Ahu Tahai, restored with coral eyes by the American archaeologist William Mullo.

The moai in the park are of varying height from 2 to 20 metres (6 to 65 ft). The volcanic rock formations quarried for sculpting are a distinctive yellow-brown volcanic tuff found only at the Ranu Raraku on the southeast side of the island. Some of the moai were also carved from red scoria. The ceremonial shrines where they are erected for offering worship are known as "ahu". Of impressive size and form, they are normally built close to the coast and parallel to it. Many unfinished moai are also found in the quarries. The production and transportation of the 887 statues are considered remarkable creative and physical feats. The moai have been under restoration since 1950. The period between 1837 and 1864 was a critical time when, for reasons that remain unknown, all the standing statues were toppled (probably during the tribal wars), although with little damage. Subsequently they were retrieved and returned to their original positions during the period of restoration with international assistance. The moai represented a clan's "most revered forebears who were believed to bestow ‘mana’ on living leaders". The park also has a few petroglyphs and paintings.

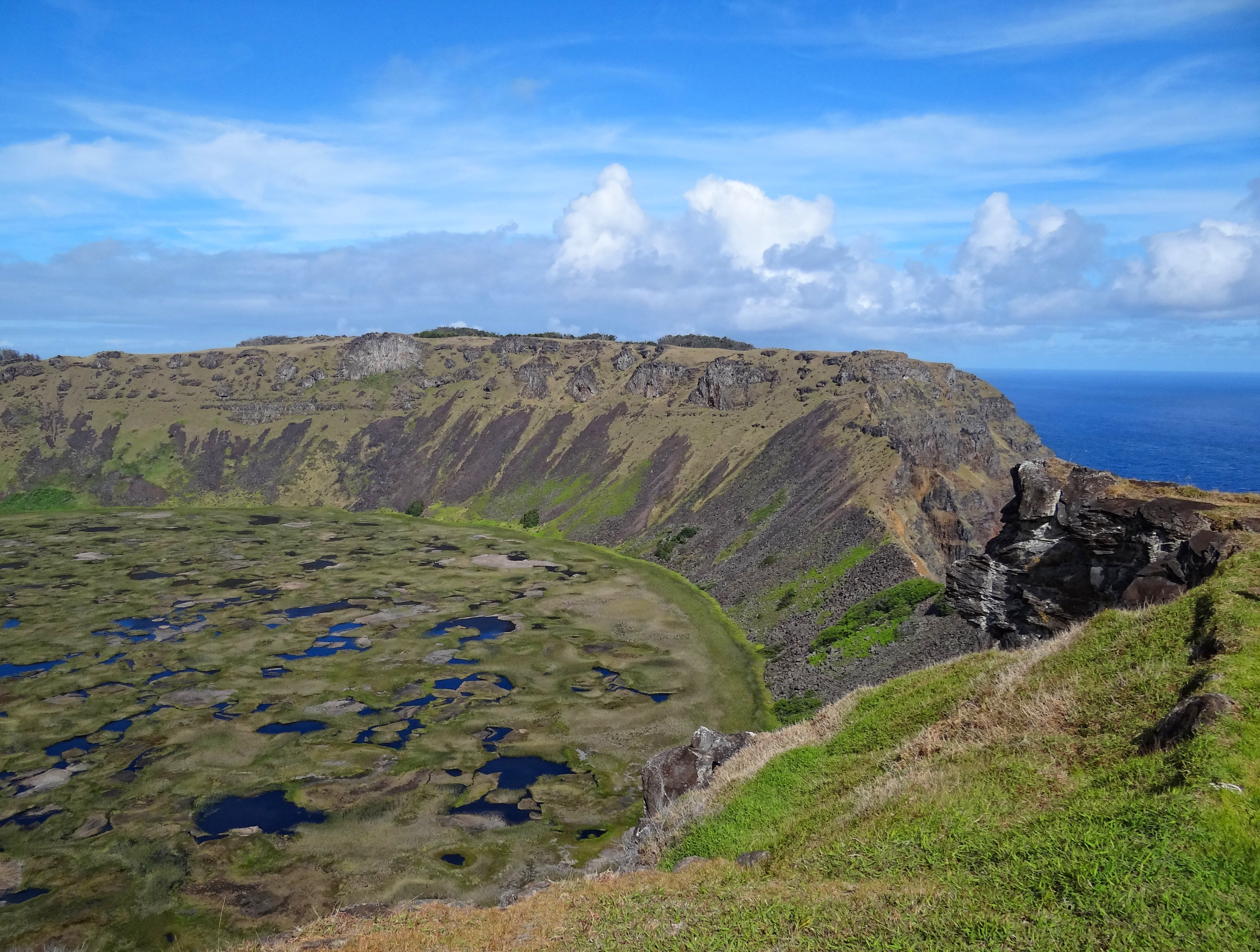
Rano Kau crater

The Birdman cult which replaced the moai cult worship was concentrated in Orongo at a ceremonial site called Mata Ngarau. The location is at an elevation of 250 metres (820 ft), on a narrow ridge between the ocean, and the deep crater of Rano Kau volcano, which last erupted about 150,000 to 210,000 years ago.

The earliest inhabitants of the island called it "Te Pito o TeHenua" (the navel/end of the world). The first European to discover the island was Dutch explorer Jacob Roggeveen on Easter day, 1722. As a result, he named it "Easter Island". He observed that the inhabitants were of three groups: "dark skinned, red skinned, and very pale skinned people with red hair". In the 19th century, a Tahitian visitor who thought the island resembled Rapa but was bigger (nui means big), gave it the Polynesian name "Rapa Nui". In Chile, the island is called "Isla De Pascua" Spanish for Easter Island.

== Ecology ==
As the island was isolated there are many endemic species of animals and plants. The park is under IUCN Management Category II in southeastern Polynesia. Its biogeographic and ecological history has undergone a sea change from what existed in the ancient days when there were palm trees and a broad leaf forest. Before the Polynesians settled here in the 4th century, the island had an extensive forest cover of trees, shrubs, ferns, and grasses. The island is now almost completely grass-covered with only a few ornamental trees and shrubs scattered over the island.

=== Flora ===
Of the 150 recorded plant species, 45 are endemic. However, the island is largely covered by grass with three endemic species. In ancient times the only species of tree found here were Sophora toromiro and Paschalococos. The toromiro tree is now extinct on the island and Paschalococos is a species that could be related to the Chilean palm, Jubaea chilensis. In the steppe areas of the island, the vegetation consists mostly of species of Austrostipa and Nassella. Other species recorded are of introduced varieties. Among the shrubs, the hau hau (Triumfetta semitriloba) is still present but Coprosma spp., is not seen on the island. The wood of the now extinct Jubaea palm was used to make devices for transporting the huge stone moai statues. It has been established by carbon dating that this species of tree existed on the island till the 17th century. Ferns are indigenous to Rapa Nui, and four of the 15 species noted are endemic: Doodia paschalis, Polystichum fuentesii, Elaphoglossum skottsbergii, and Thelypteris espinosae. Triumfetta semitriloba which was considered an extinct species on the island was located in 1988. According to a recent report (1991), apart from 166 introduced species of plants, 46 indigenous plant species including nine endemic species have been recorded. Also noted in the lower level of the Rano Raraku crater are tall bulrushes like totora that were probably introduced by seafarers from South America.

=== Fauna ===
The island's only mammals are rodents and carnivorans. The reptiles recorded are three species of marine turtles and two terrestrial lizards, Lepidodactylus lugubris and Ablepharus boutoui poecilopleurus. Four bird species – three terrestrial and one marine – are found on the island. These are: Fregata nubor, red-tailed tropicbird (Phaethon rubricauda), and Kermadec petrel. Three micro-lepidopteran species are reported in the park which have no links to South American species; one of these is Asymphorodes trichogramma.

== Conservation ==
Invasive plants have been introduced for livestock grazing. Forest fires are a common feature, threatening the remaining native plant species. Archaeological investigations indicate the terrain is subject to damage from erosion and the influx of tourists.

Though declared a national park in 1935, the first management plan (by CONAF) was not implemented until the 1980s. As a result of inadequate funding, conservation was initially at a low level leading international conservation agencies to provide financial and technical support. Chile responded by setting up a Rapa Nui Monuments Board which enabled actions to be taken independent of the government. The World Monument Fund started working here in 1968 with UNESCO later recognizing the site as a World Heritage site of cultural importance. With an airline operating (the airport built in 1965 was expanded in 1985) between Chile and the island, more scientists have become interested in island's heritage, undertaking research on various aspects of its now defunct culture.

The Rapa Nui National Park is now under the administrative control of the Ma´u Henua Polynesian Indigenous Community, which is the first autonomous institute on the island. The indigenous Rapa Nui people have regained authority over their ancestral lands and are in charge of the management, preservation and protection of their patrimony. On the first of December 2017, the ex-President Michelle Bachelet returned ancestral lands in the form of the Rapa Nui National Park to the indigenous people. For the first time in history, the revenue generated by the National Park is invested in the island and used to conserve the natural heritage.

Its conservation value is dictated by the archaeological investigations of the important intangible value of its cultural heritage. The management plan drawn by the park administration is oriented towards these archaeological investigations. Zoning of the park has been done accordingly under the classification of intangible zone, primitive zone, extensive use zone, service and CONAF (1976) zone and special use zone. A harmonious blend of conservation activities in the reserve areas (including monoliths and structures) with agricultural activities, livestock grazing, orchards and traditional fishing sites has evolved in the integrated management plans for the island.

== Sister parks ==
- Teide National Park (Tenerife, Spain).

== Gallery ==
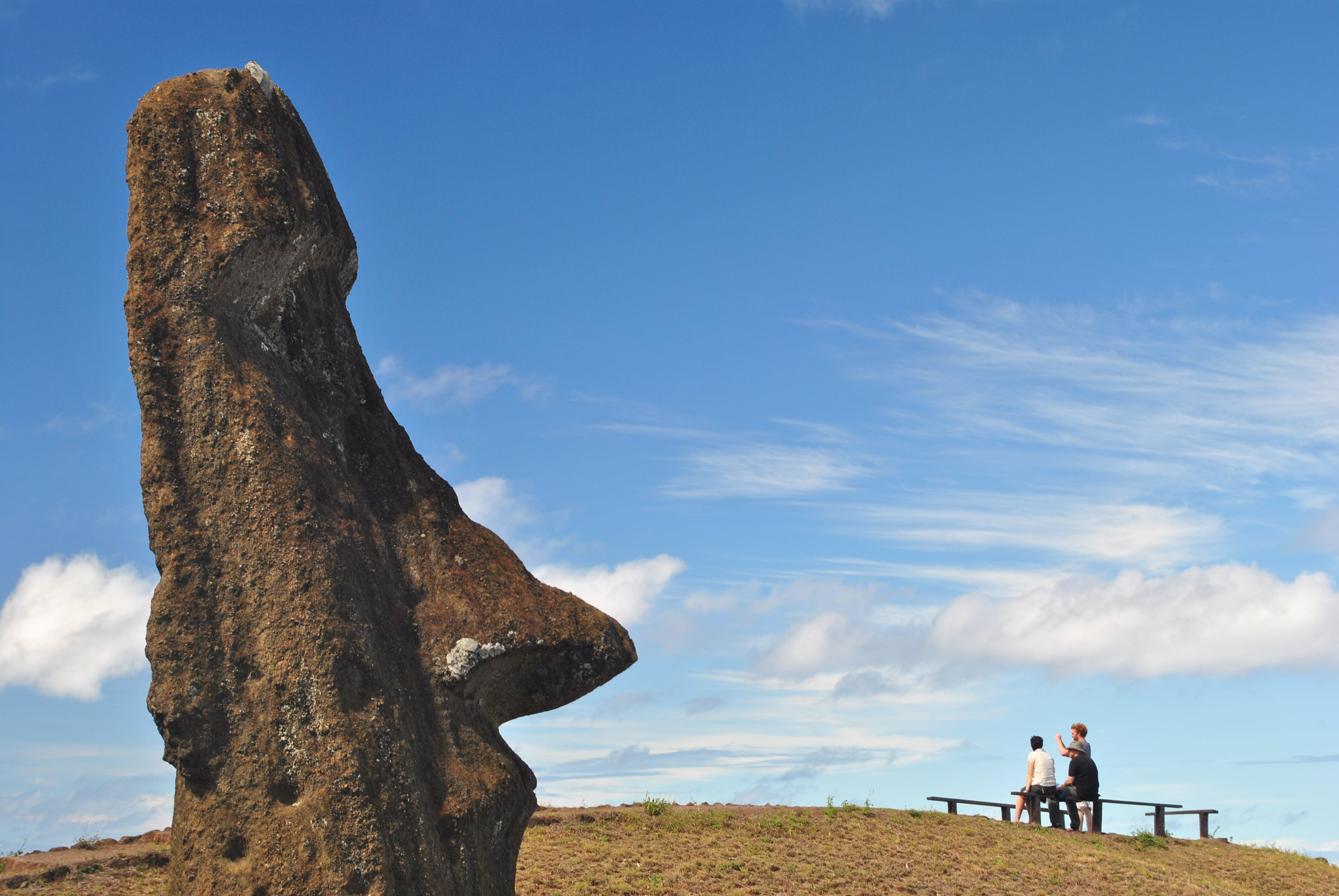
Monument in Rapa Nui

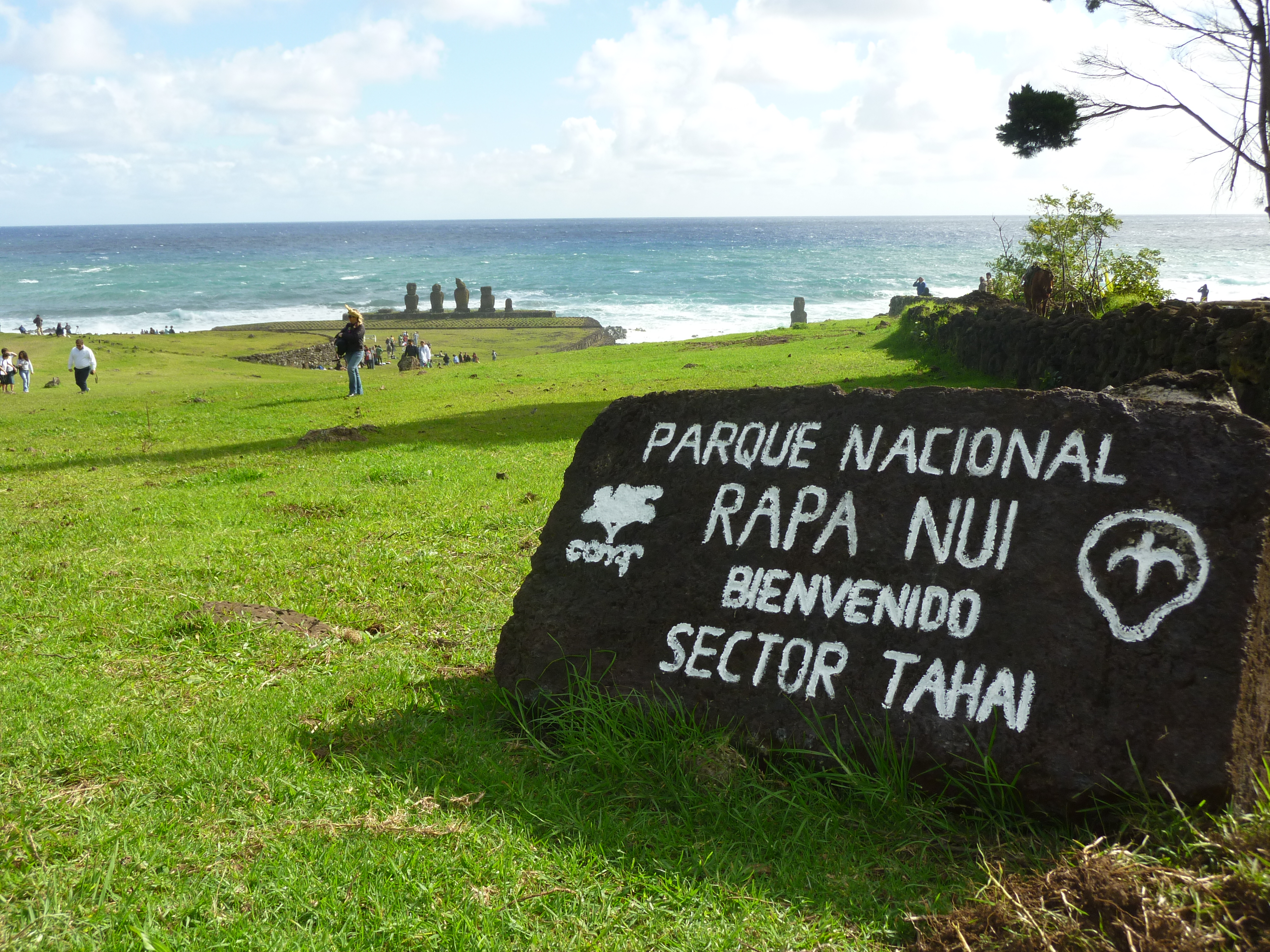
Rapa Nui, Easter Island

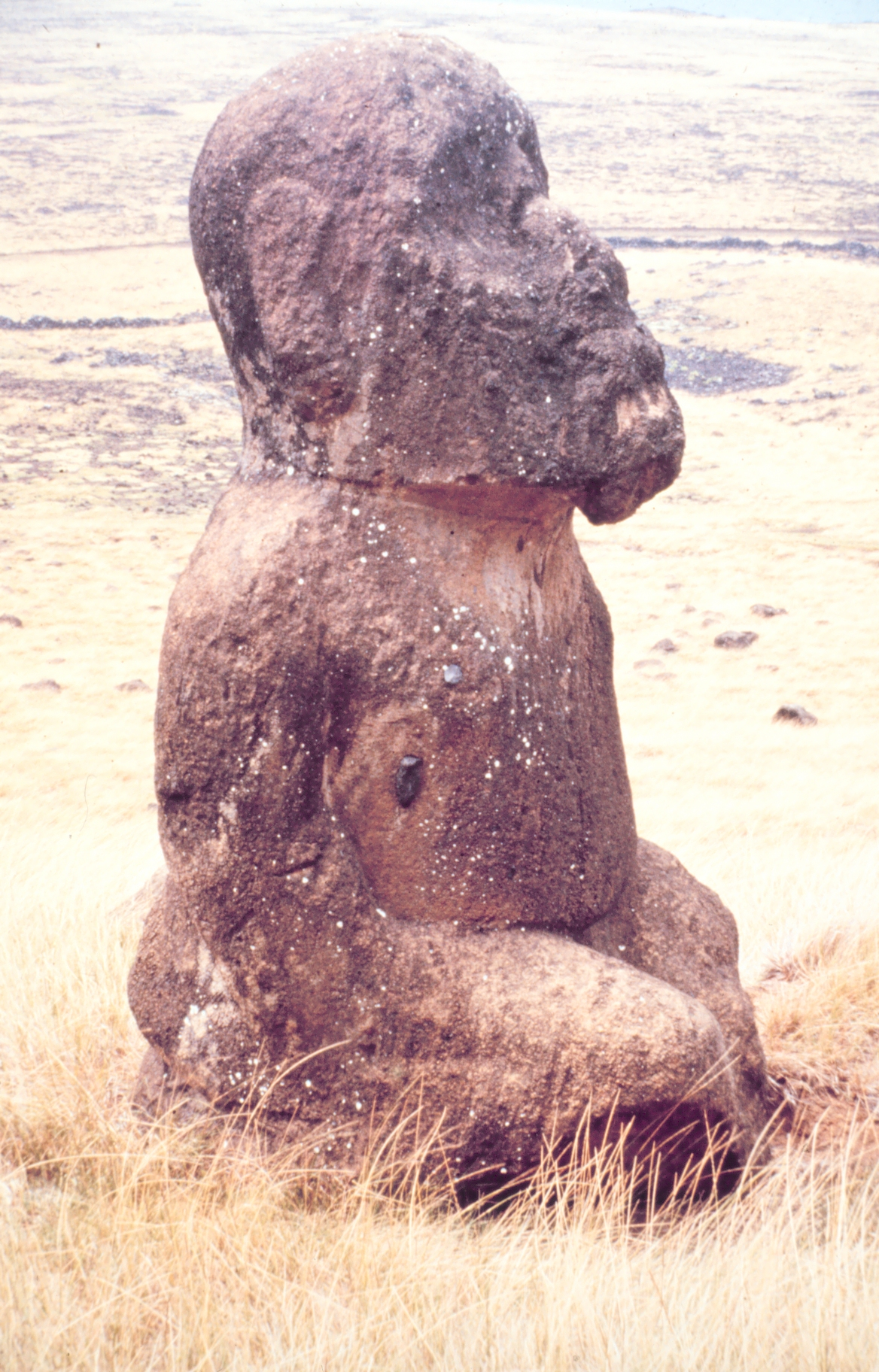
Tukuturi, a moai at Rano Raraku

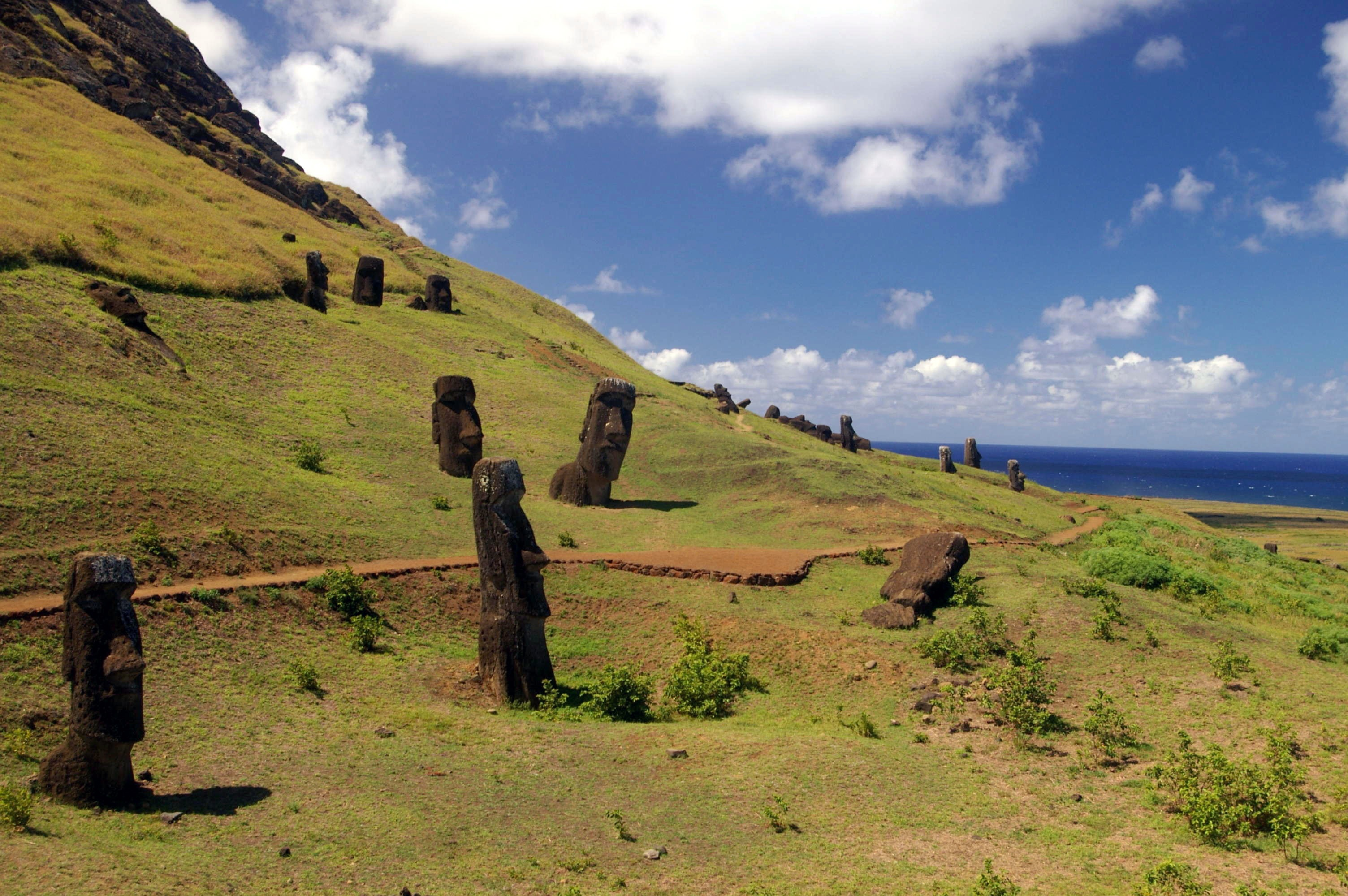
Outer slope of the Rano Raraku volcano, the quarry of the moai with many uncompleted statues.

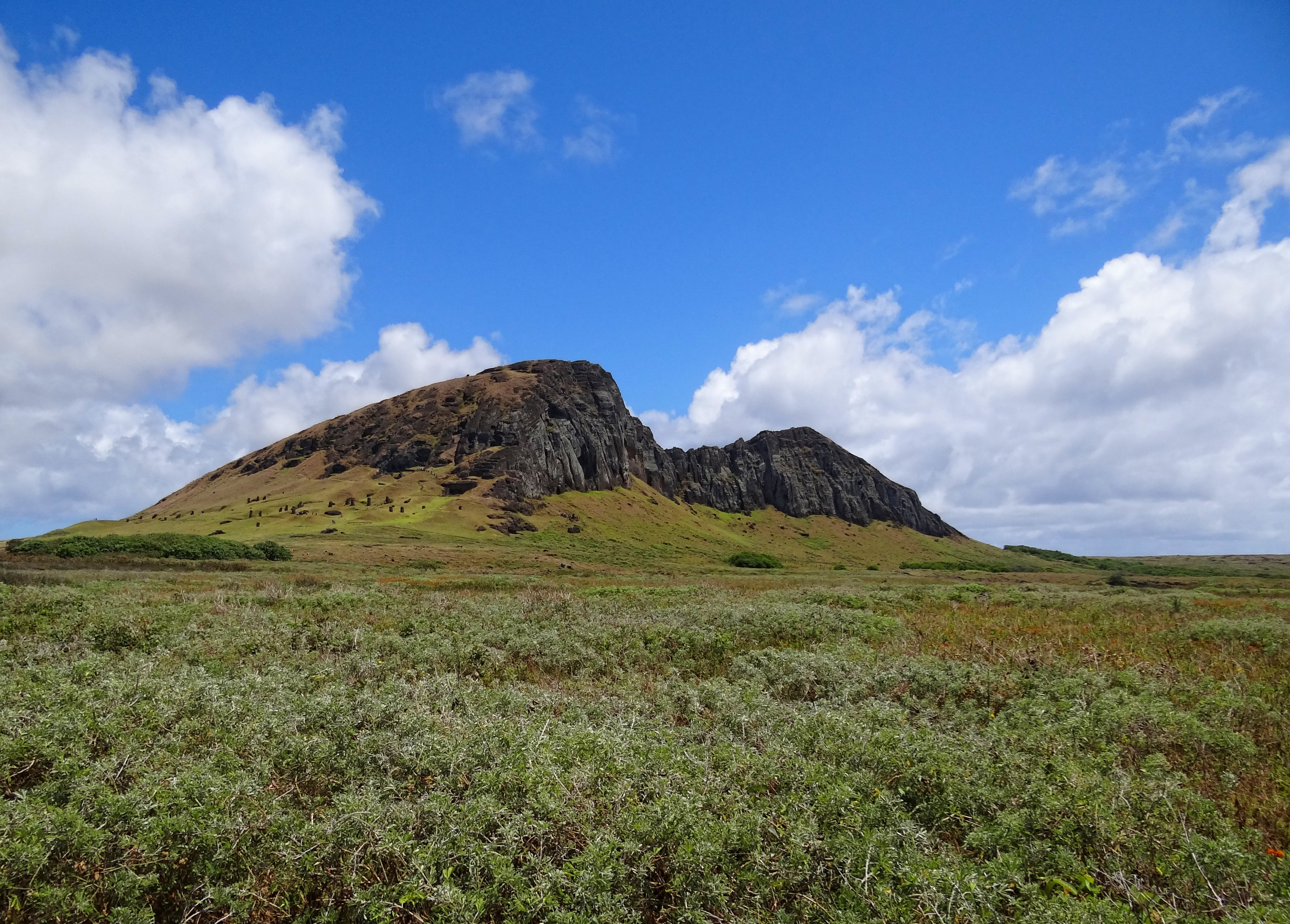
Rano Raraku volcano from the south

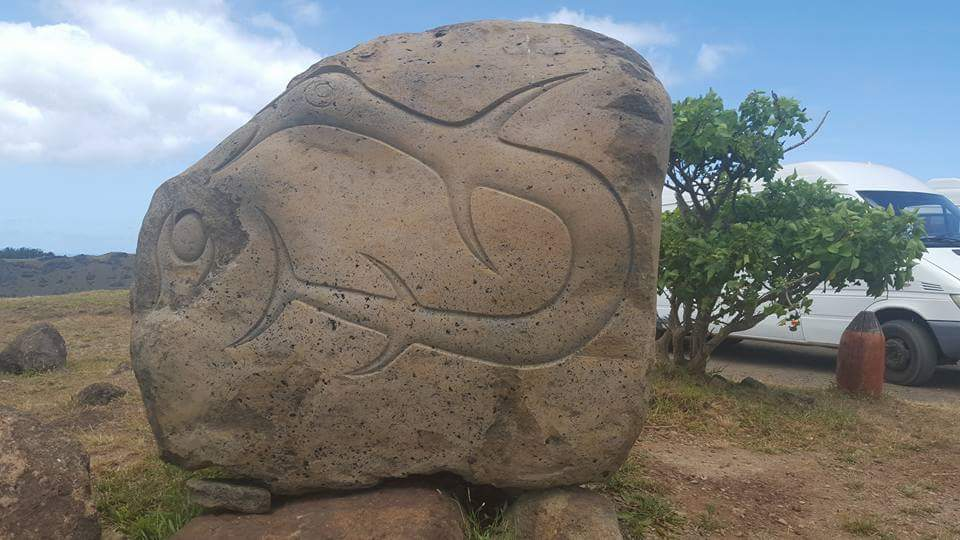

== Bibliography ==
- Barbour, Jeff (1 March 2007). Ritual of Stone. Lulu.com. pp. 113–. ISBN 978-1-84728-183-8.
- Fischer, Steven R. (2005). Island at the End of the World: The Turbulent History of Easter Island. Reaktion Books. ISBN 978-1-86189-245-4.
- Haughton, Brian (3 April 2009). Hidden History. ReadHowYouWant.com. ISBN 978-1-4587-0120-6.
- Session, IUCN Commission on National Parks and Protected Areas. Working (1981). Conservar el patrimonio natural de América Latina y del Caribe: la planificación y administración de las áreas protegidas en la región neotropical : actas de la 18a Sesión de Trabajo de la Comisión solere Parques Nacionales y Areas Protegidas de la UICN, Lima, Perú, 21–28 junio 1981. IUCN. ISBN 978-2-88032-408-7.
- Stubbs, John H.; Makaš, Emily G. (4 May 2011). Architectural Conservation in Europe and the Americas. John Wiley & Sons. ISBN 978-0-470-90111-3.
