= Makemake (deity) =

Deity in the Rapa Nui mythology of Easter Island

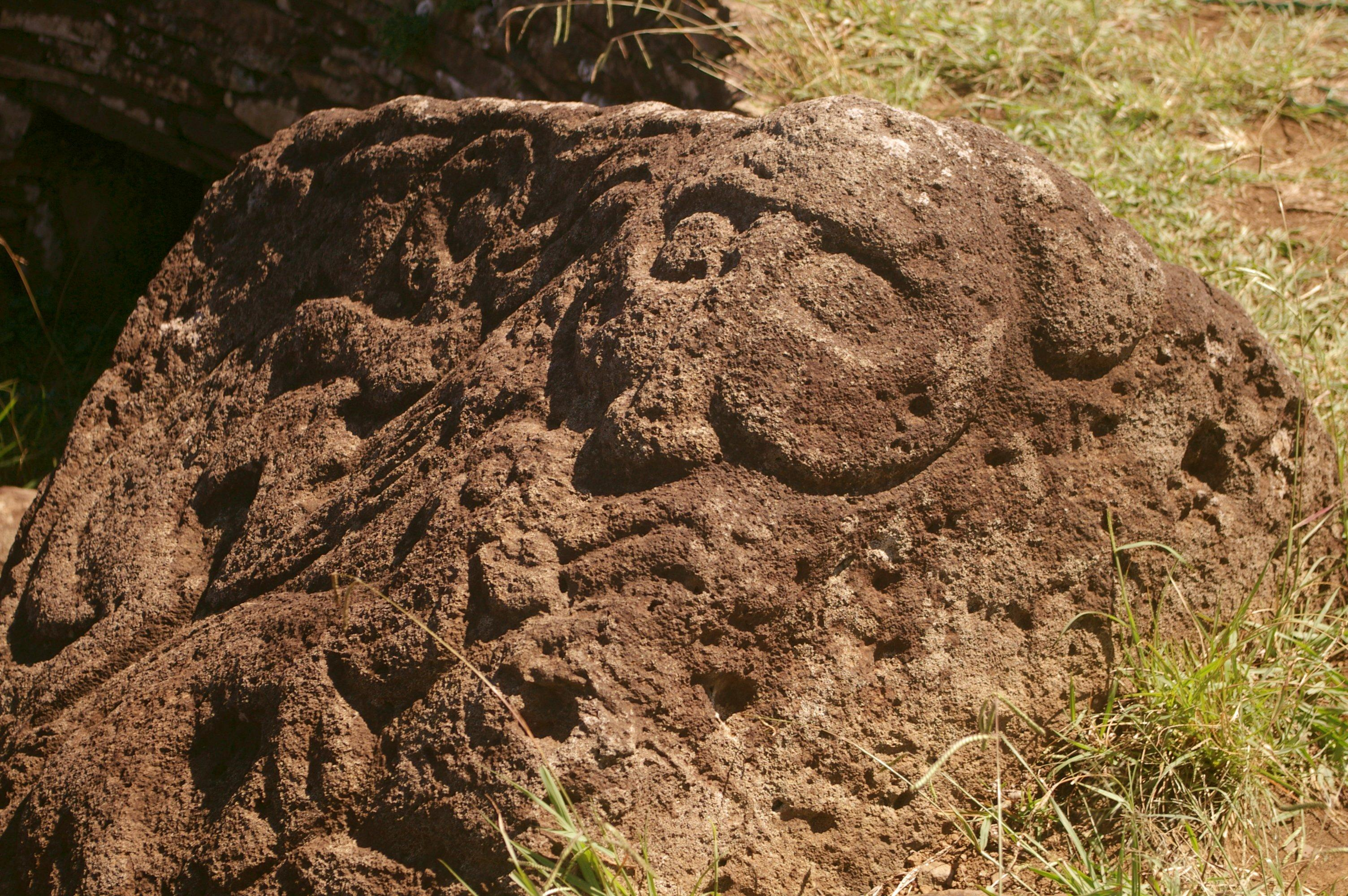
Makemake with two birdmen, carved from red scoria

Makemake (also written as Make-make; pronounced [ˈmakeˈmake] in Rapa Nui) in the Rapa Nui mythology of Easter Island is the creator of humanity, the god of fertility and the chief god of the "Tangata manu" or bird-man sect (this sect succeeded the island's more famous Moai era). He appeared to be the local form, or name, of the old Polynesian god Tane. He had no wife.

Makemake, as a face with large eyes or perhaps a skull with large eye sockets and a phallic nose, is a frequent subject of the Rapa Nui petroglyphs.

== The Birdman sect ==
Métraux states that Easter Island's "greatest religious festival, the only one concerning which circumstantial details survive, was that of the bird-man, intimately linked with the cult of the god Makemake."

Makemake drove the birds to nest on the islet of Motu Nui ('big islet'), the center of the tangata-manu (bird-man) sect. Four gods were associated with it: Makemake; Haua-tuꞌu-take-take, usually simply called "Haua"; vîꞌe Hoa, Haua's wife; and vîꞌe Kenatea. Each of the four gods had a supernatural servant, whose "names were given" in the ceremonies.

The ivi atua was the 'seer' who has the vision to select who swam to Motu Nui. A hopu was one of those who make the swim to the islet. Per Englert, the hopu manu were "those who served the tagata manu and, upon finding the first manutara egg, took it to Orongo [on the mainland]." The manu tara, or sooty tern, was the bird that the ceremony centred on; it was the first manu tara egg that was the goal of the ceremony.

== Companions ==
Makemake's principal companion was Haua. "The formula which accompanies an offering to Makemake always includes Haua who appears in the myth as the god's companion."

Makemake's offspring were Tive, Rorai, Hova and "the noblewoman Arangi-kote-kote".

== Astronomy ==
The trans-Neptunian dwarf planet Makemake is so named because sightings of both the dwarf planet and the island occurred close to Easter: the dwarf planet was discovered shortly after Easter 2005, and the first European contact with Easter Island was on Easter Sunday 1722. The dwarf planet's code name was "Easterbunny".

== In popular culture ==
In 2000, BBC produced the documentary The Lost Gods of Easter Island which featured a carved wooden idol that David Attenborough purchased for a relatively low price at auction. It is determined that it was a carving of Makemake fashioned from the now locally-extinct Toromiro wood on Easter Island. The carving had been one of two traded with the crew of Captain Cook's ship and transported to Tahiti and given to family members of a Tahitian member of Cook's crew.

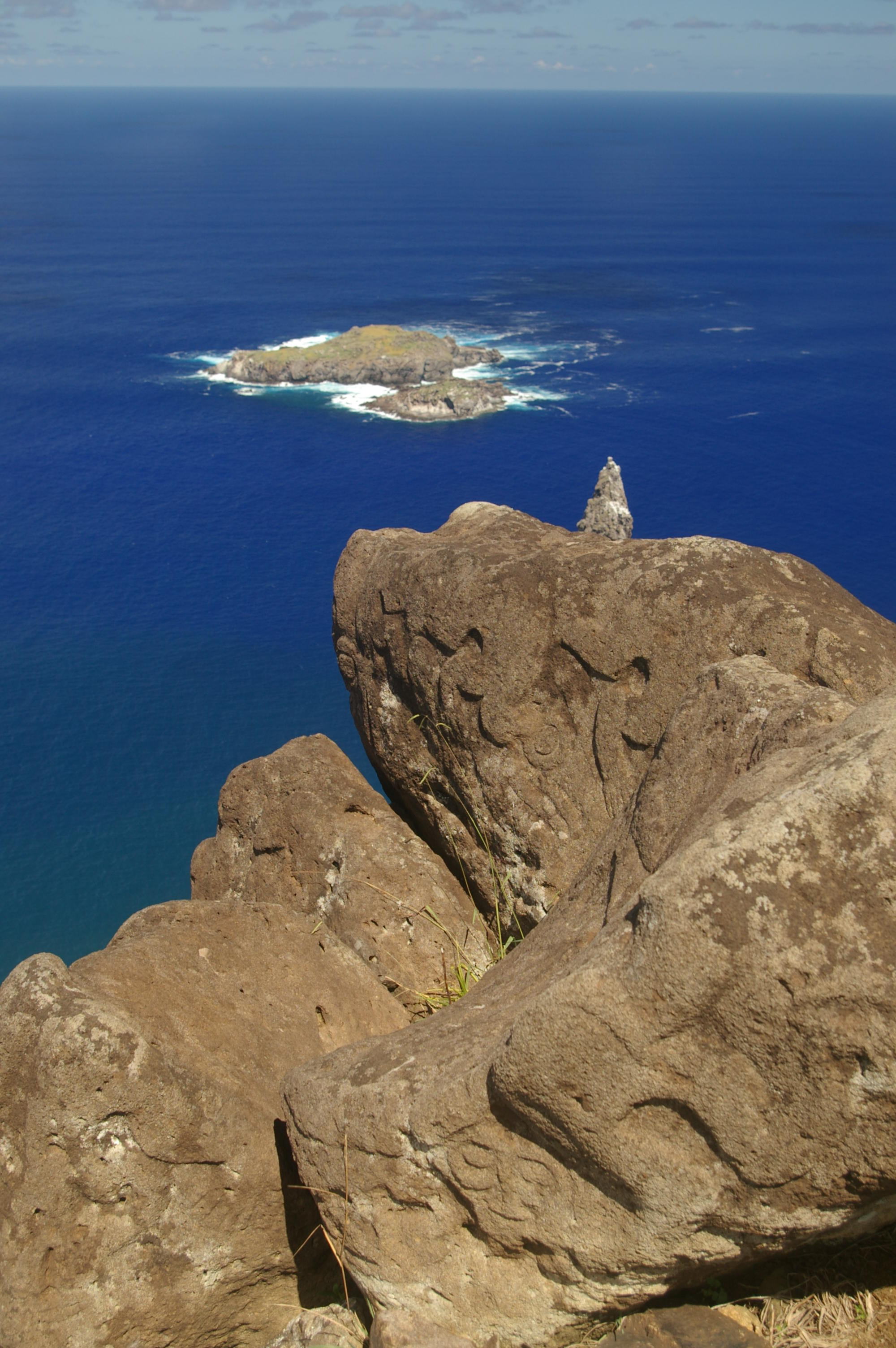
Petroglyphs on rocks at Orongo. Makemake at base and two birdmen higher up
