= Anakena =

Beach on Easter Island

Coordinates: 27°04′26″S 109°19′22″W

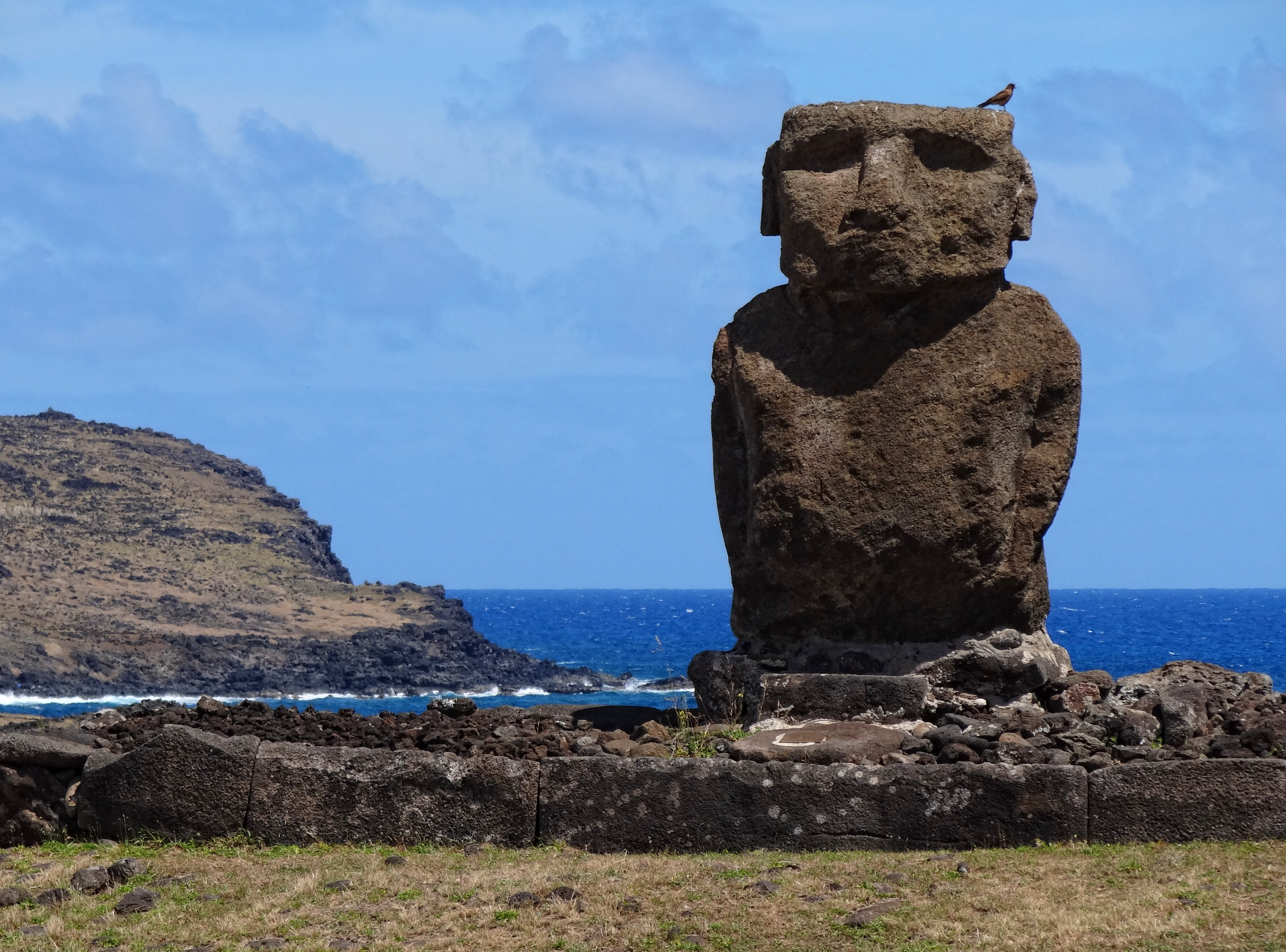
Ahu Ature on Anakena Beach.

Anakena is a white coral sand beach in Rapa Nui National Park on Rapa Nui (Easter Island), a Chilean island in the Pacific Ocean. Anakena has two ahus; Ahu-Ature has a single moai and Ahu Nao-Nao has seven, two of which have deteriorated. It also has a palm grove and a car park.

A possible meaning of Anakena could be cave ("ana" in Rapa Nui language) of kena, an autochthonous name by which the masked booby (Sula dactylatra) is known, a sea bird that still nests in the island, forming an important part of the local spiritual and natural landscape. Actually the real name of the beach and the small bay is Hanga Mori o One, also called Hanga Rau Ariki or Kings Bay, in honor of the first founder. The name by which the beach is actually known comes from a nearby cave where it seems that Hotu Matu’a could have been installed while building a house for him.

Anakena is unusual for Easter Island in that it is one of only two small sandy beaches in an otherwise rocky coastline.

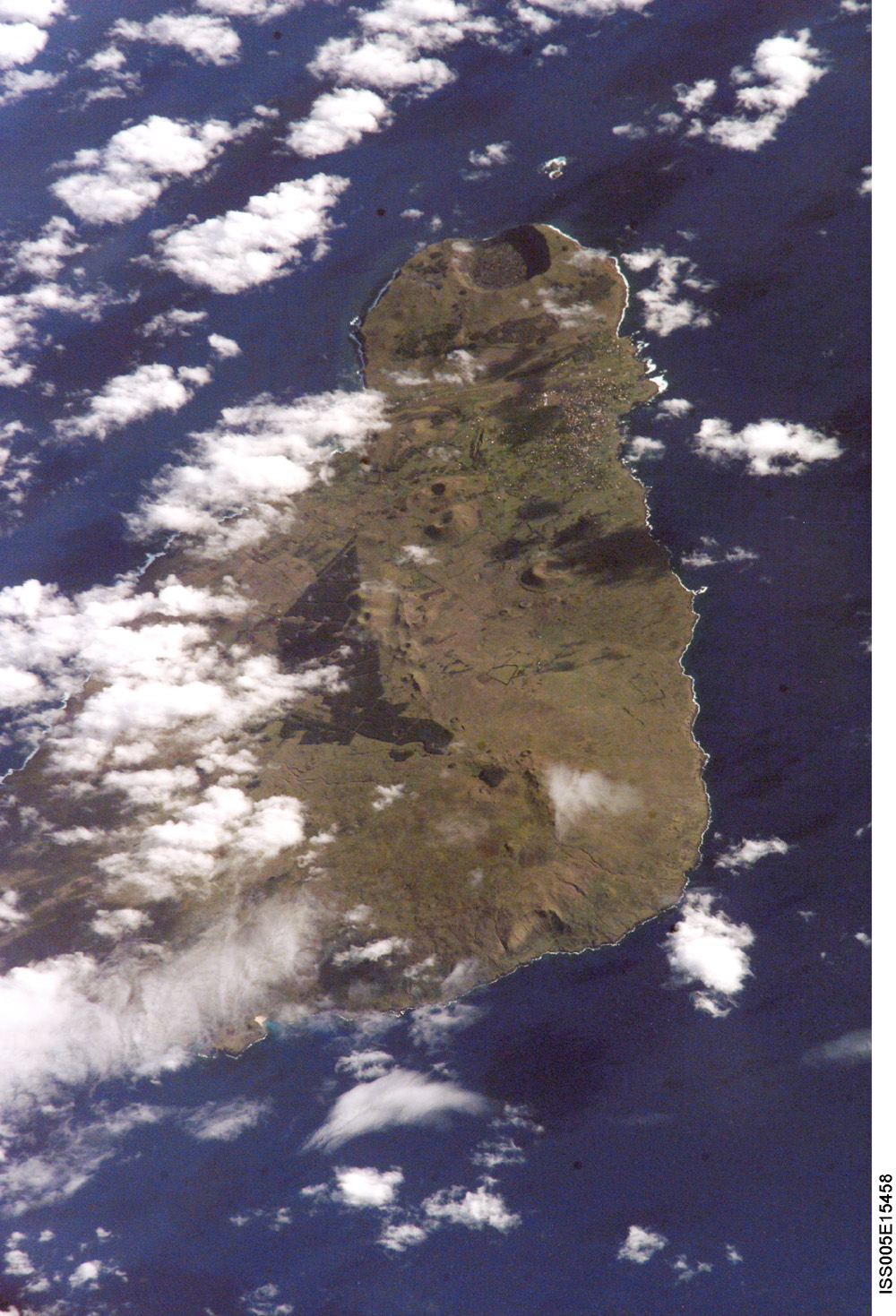
Easter Island from space with Anakena bottom left, its sandy beach and turquoise shallows almost the only gap in the island's surf. Rano Kau is at top with Hanga Roa just below it and Terevaka prominent above Anakena. A west up photo from NASA.

== Legend and history ==
According to island oral traditions, Anakena was the landing place of Hotu Matu'a, a Polynesian chief who led a two-canoe settlement party here and founded the first settlement on Rapa Nui.

It was later a ceremonial centre where islanders read from Rongorongo boards.

Anakena featured in the Tangata manu or Birdman cult as in years when the new Birdman was from the western clans, he would end his celebrations at Anakena.

== Archaeology ==
Modern archaeology has found traces of human settlement at Anakena as early as 1200 CE, though linguistic and other analysis indicates a range of dates for first settlement of Rapa Nui between 300 and 1200 CE.

Anakena has been the site of several archaeological digs including those of Katherine Routledge in 1914 and both William Mulloy and Thor Heyerdahl in the 1950s, and both of its ahus have been restored.

== Popular culture ==
Anakena was used as one of the film locations for the 1994 Kevin Reynolds film Rapa Nui.

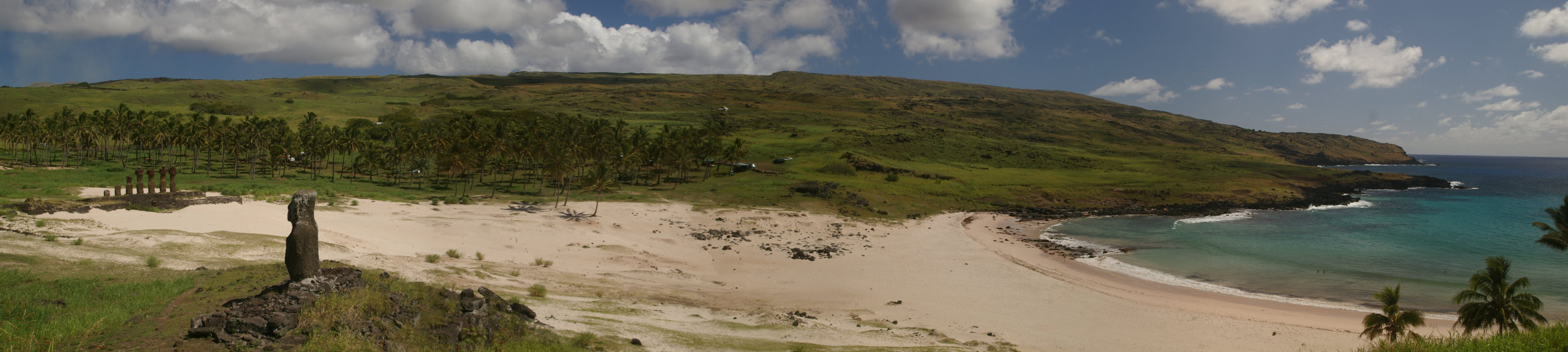
Panorama of Anakena beach, Easter Island
