= Ana Kai Tangata =

Sea cave on Easter Island, Chile

Coordinates: 27.16168°S 109.44220°W

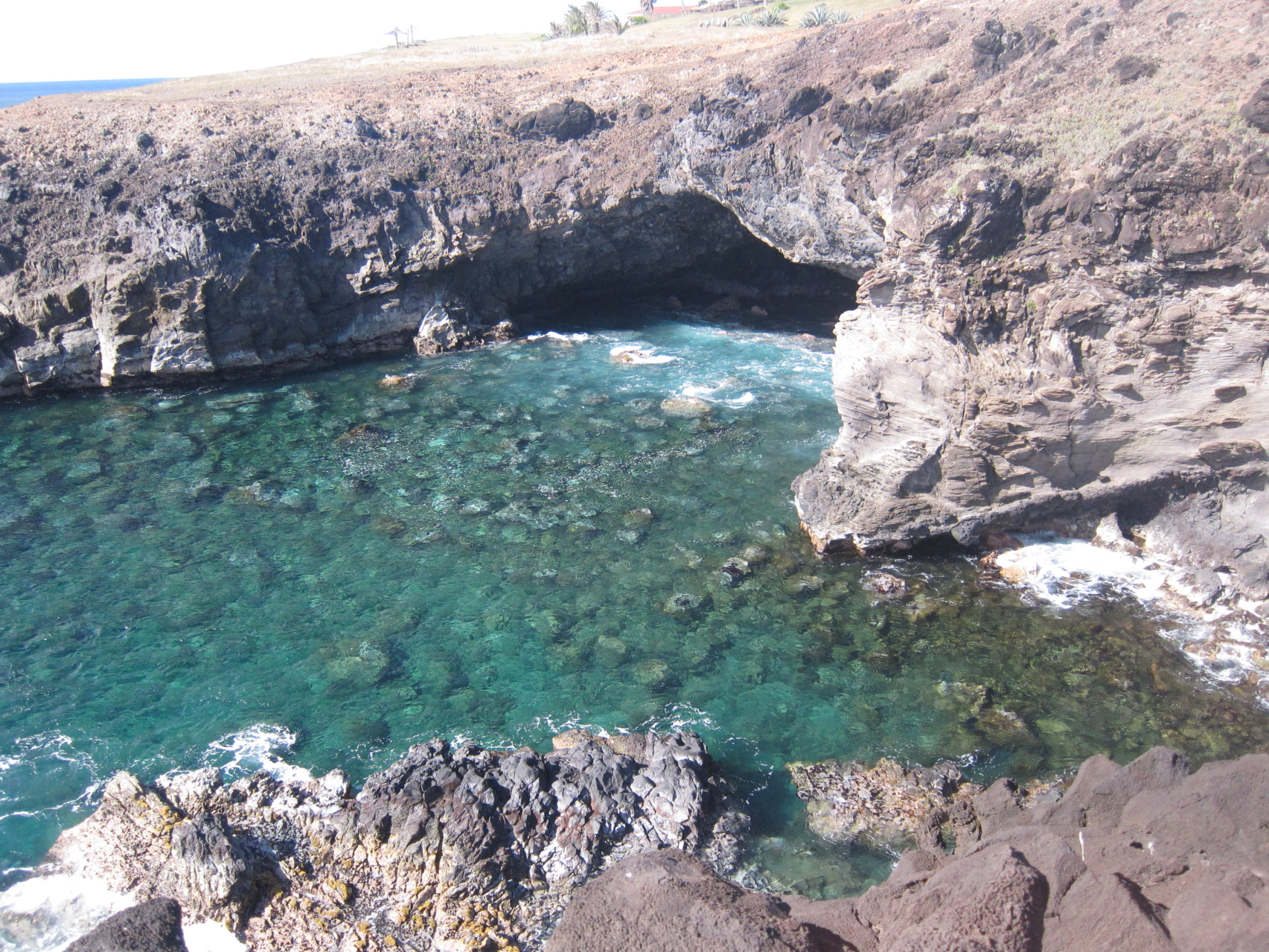
Ana Kai Tangata entrance

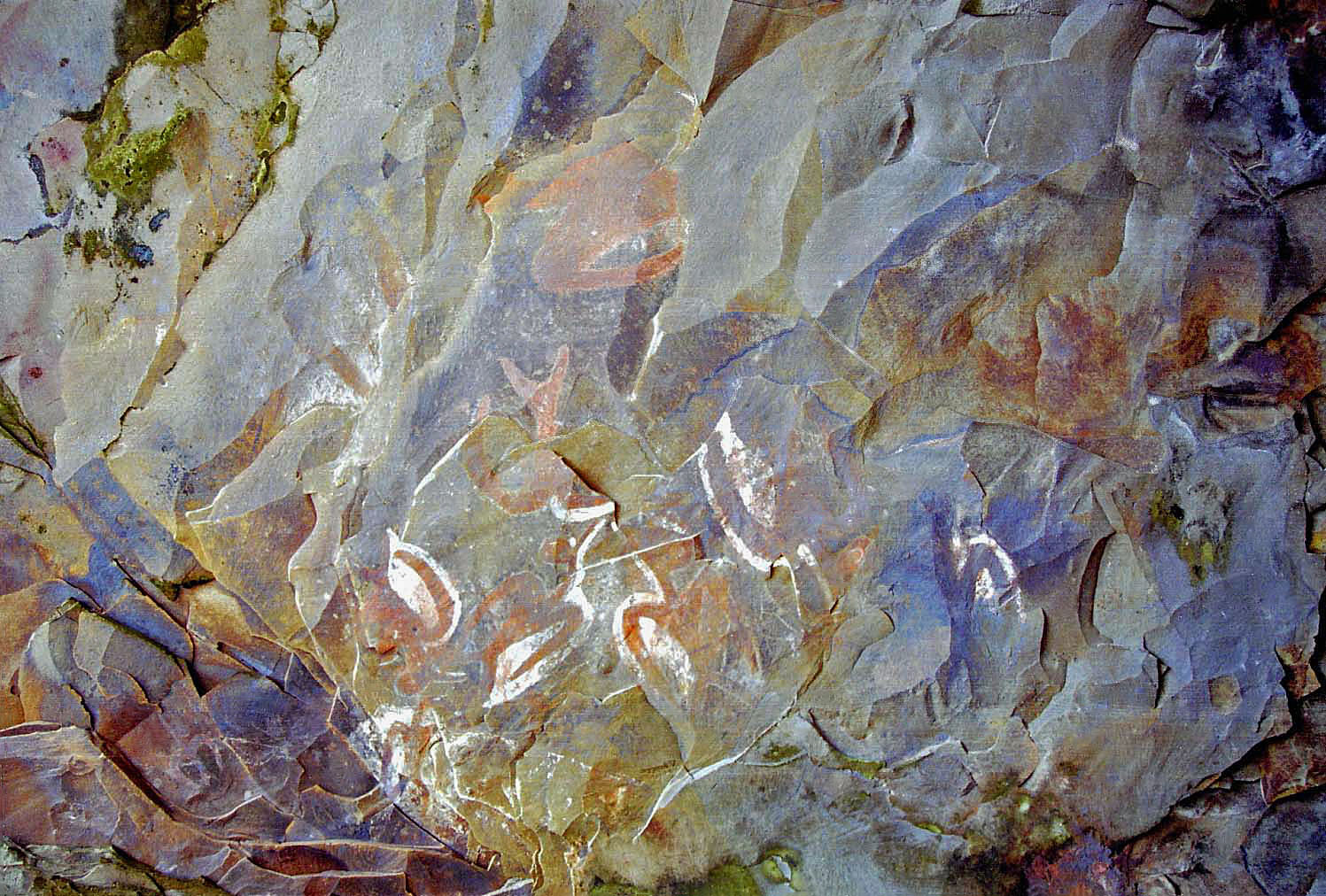
Cave paintings of birds, January 1998

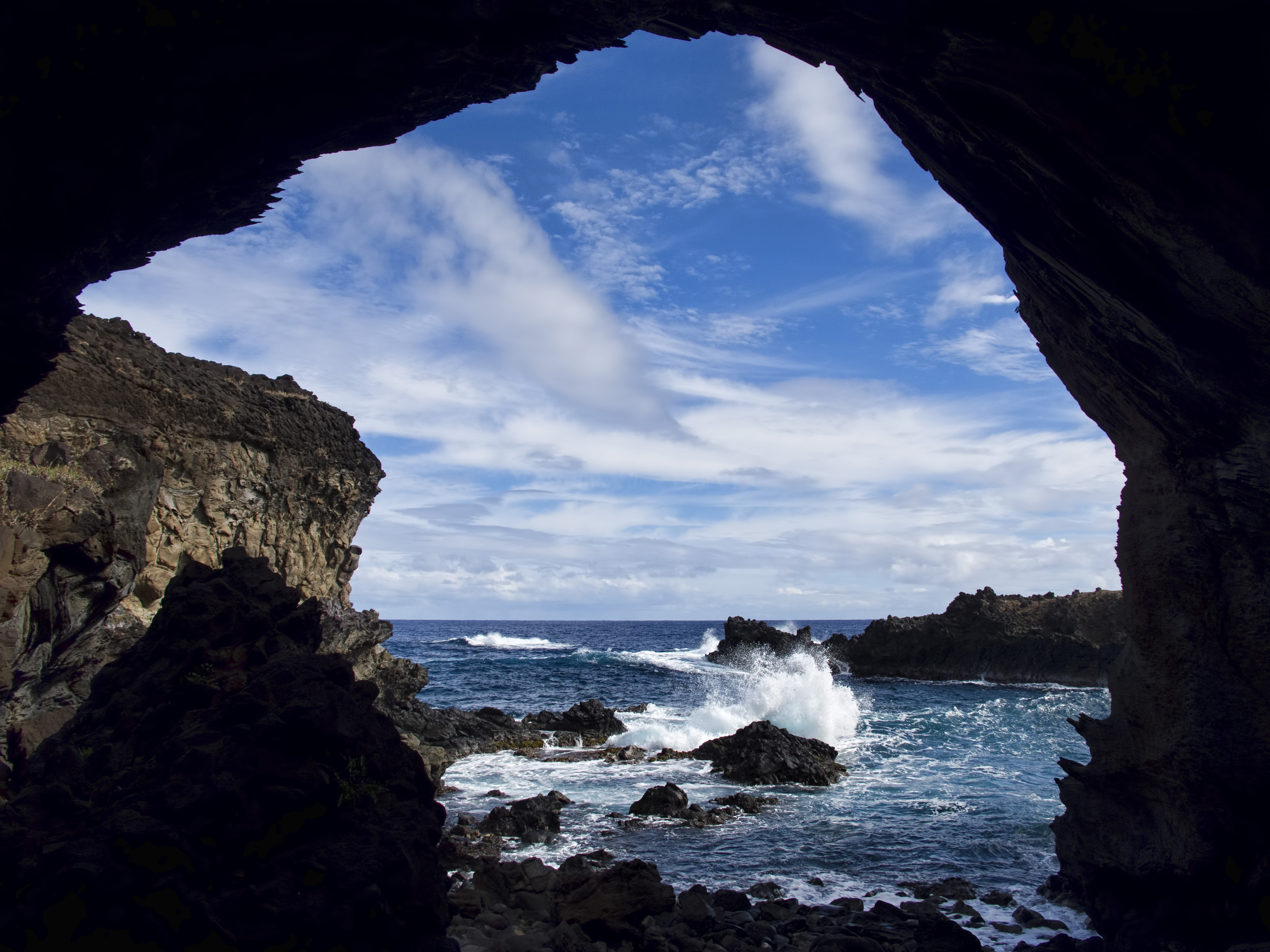
View of the ocean from inside the cave

Ana Kai Tangata (officially in rapanui: Ana Kai Taŋata) is a sea cave in Easter Island that contains rock art of terns on its ceiling. It is located near Mataveri, and the cave opens up directly to the incoming surf. The cave is accessible and one of the most visited caves on Easter Island.

== Physical description ==
The cave itself is made of volcanic rock that had been eroded away by the ocean. It is 10 meters high, 5 meters wide, and 15 meters deep. Although it opens out to the ocean, the cave is above the high tide line allowing for accessibility. Irregular boulders cover the floor of the cave, and the ceiling of the cave is domed and has good acoustic properties.

== Cave paintings ==
The cave paintings are in red, white, and black and are mostly of the Manutara or the sooty tern. This bird was considered sacred by the followers of the cult of Tangata manu. There are also images of boats, both Polynesian canoes and European ships which may have been considered by the natives to be messengers from another world. The pigments were created by vegetables and minerals from the Ahu Vinapu area mixed with shark oil. A taheta can be found in the cave, which is a basin that was dug into a rock that may have been used to create the colors. Due to water leaks above and the salt from the ocean, the pigments of the paintings are fading.

== Etymology ==
The cave is also known as "Cave of the Cannibals", although the translation is unclear. In Rapa Nui language, ana means cave and tangata means man, but kai could have several meanings. American archaeologist, Georgia Lee, proposed that the name means "cave where men eat", "cave where men are eaten", or "cave that eats men". This name may be related to legends that cannibalism occurred in the cave, but evidence is lacking. According to some of these legends, there was a battle where the defeated fled to caverns, where the victors captured and ate them. Cannibal feasts possibly could have been held there in the times of the birdman cult, and bones from animals and humans (and some needles formed from human bone) were reportedly found there. This site was also known to contain a carved ceremonial skull. Additionally, the cave is near the start of the Sendero Te Ara o Te Ao, trails that lead to Rano Kau and Orongo.
