= Haua =

Deity of the Rapa Nui people

Haua (/ˈhaʊə/) or Haua tuꞌu taketake, also known as the 'Chief of the eggs', was the companion of the creator god Makemake of Easter Island. Little is known of him, or of any aspects of indigenous religion on the island, but prayers said before eating were made to the two of them. His wife was vîꞌe Hoa.

Only a few details of Haua have been preserved. Along with Makemake, he was central to the Birdman sect of Eastern Island. He and Makemake had removed nesting seabirds to the offshore islets of Motu Nui ('big islet') and Motu Iti ('little islet'), because people were eating all of their eggs, and established the Birdman sect through a priestess who came across the two gods.

Haua and Makemake instructed the priestess to tell the Rapa Nui that before eating, when they took the food from the oven, they should set aside a portion and say 'Take for Haua, for Makemake!' (Ka toꞌo ma Haua, ma Makemake).
