= Motu Iti (Rapa Nui) =

Islet near Easter Island

Coordinates: 27°11′44″S 109°26′59″W

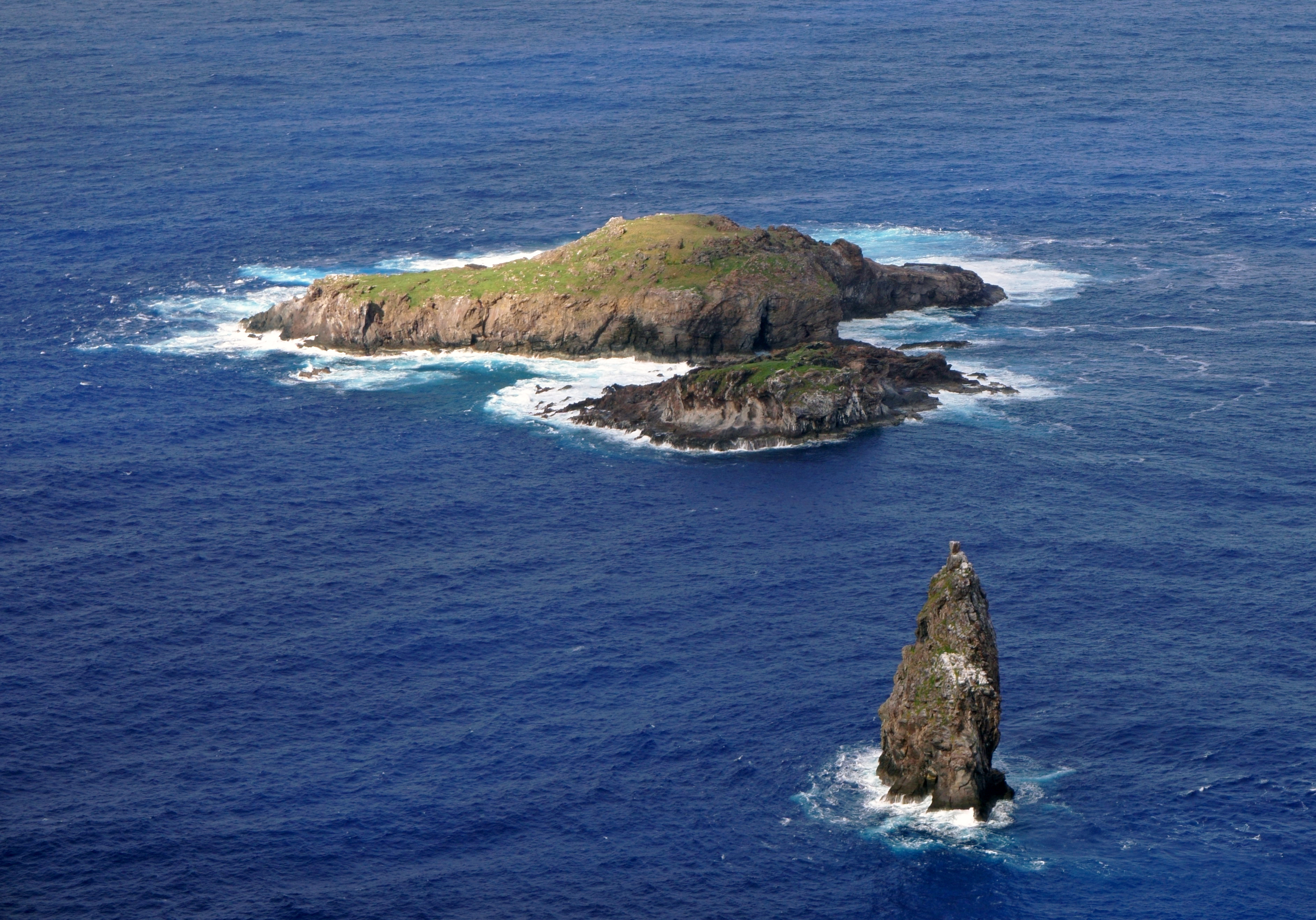
Motu Nui, with the smaller Motu Iti and the sea stack of Motu Kao Kao. Picture taken September 2018, from Orongo on the Rano Kau volcano, around 250 meters (820 feet) above sea level.

Motu Iti, or Little island in the Rapa Nui language, is a small uninhabited islet off the south western corner of Easter Island. It is located only 50 m from neighbouring Motu Nui, and about a mile from Rano Kau. The island measures 160 by 140 metres, and has a land area of 1.5 hectares, which makes it the second largest of the five satellite islands of Easter Island, after Motu Nui.

Oral histories of the Rapanui people establish the islet as a site of refuge during intertribal warfare, as well as a source of obsidian for sharp edged tools and for an annual harvest of eggs and fledglings from the seabirds that nested on it. There is an obsidion quarry at the summit of the island, and a pair of rock shelters used for flaking the obsidion.

Nowadays it is a bird sanctuary and part of the Rapa Nui National Park. Seabirds nesting on Motu Iti include the sooty tern.

== See also ==
- Orongo
- Tangata Manu
