= Hauā =

Hauā is a Wharenui of New Zealand. The name may be short for:

- Te Iti a Hauā
- Ngāti Hauā

== See also ==
- Haua, companion of the creator god Makemake of Easter Island
