= Tangata manu =

Winner of a traditional competition of Easter Island

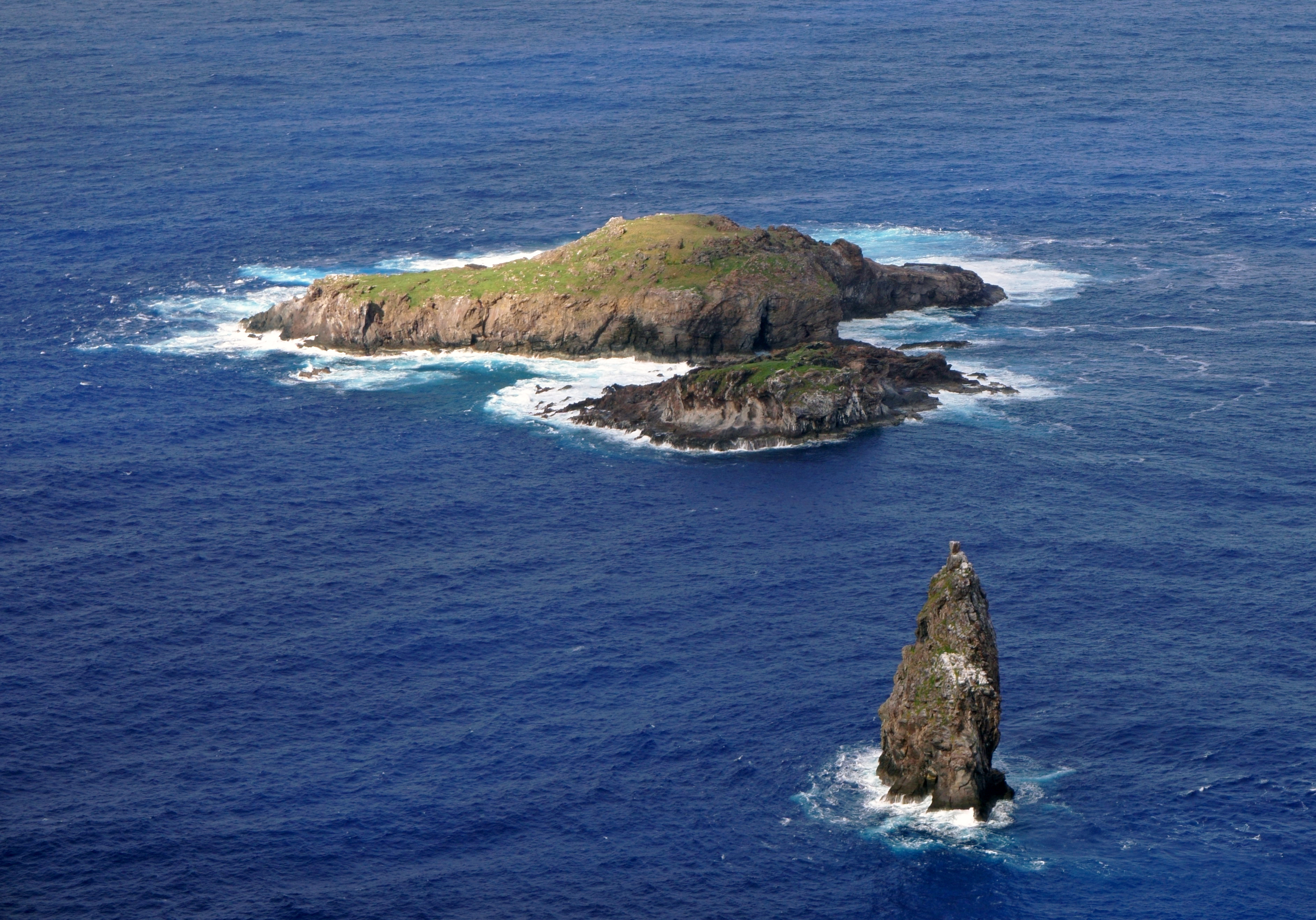
Motu Nui, with the smaller Motu Iti in front and the isolated sea stack of Motu Kau Kau in the foreground. Viewed from the top of a 250-meter (820 feet) sea cliff at Orongo.

The Tangata manu (Rapa Nui: taŋata manu; lit. 'birdman') was the winner of a traditional ritual competition on Rapa Nui (Easter Island). Competitors nominate adult men to collect the first sooty tern (manu tara) egg of the season from the nearby islet of Motu Nui, swim back to Rapa Nui, and climb the sea cliffs of Rano Kau to the clifftop village of Orongo.

Bird-man (Tangata manu) paintings in the Ana Kai Tangata cave.

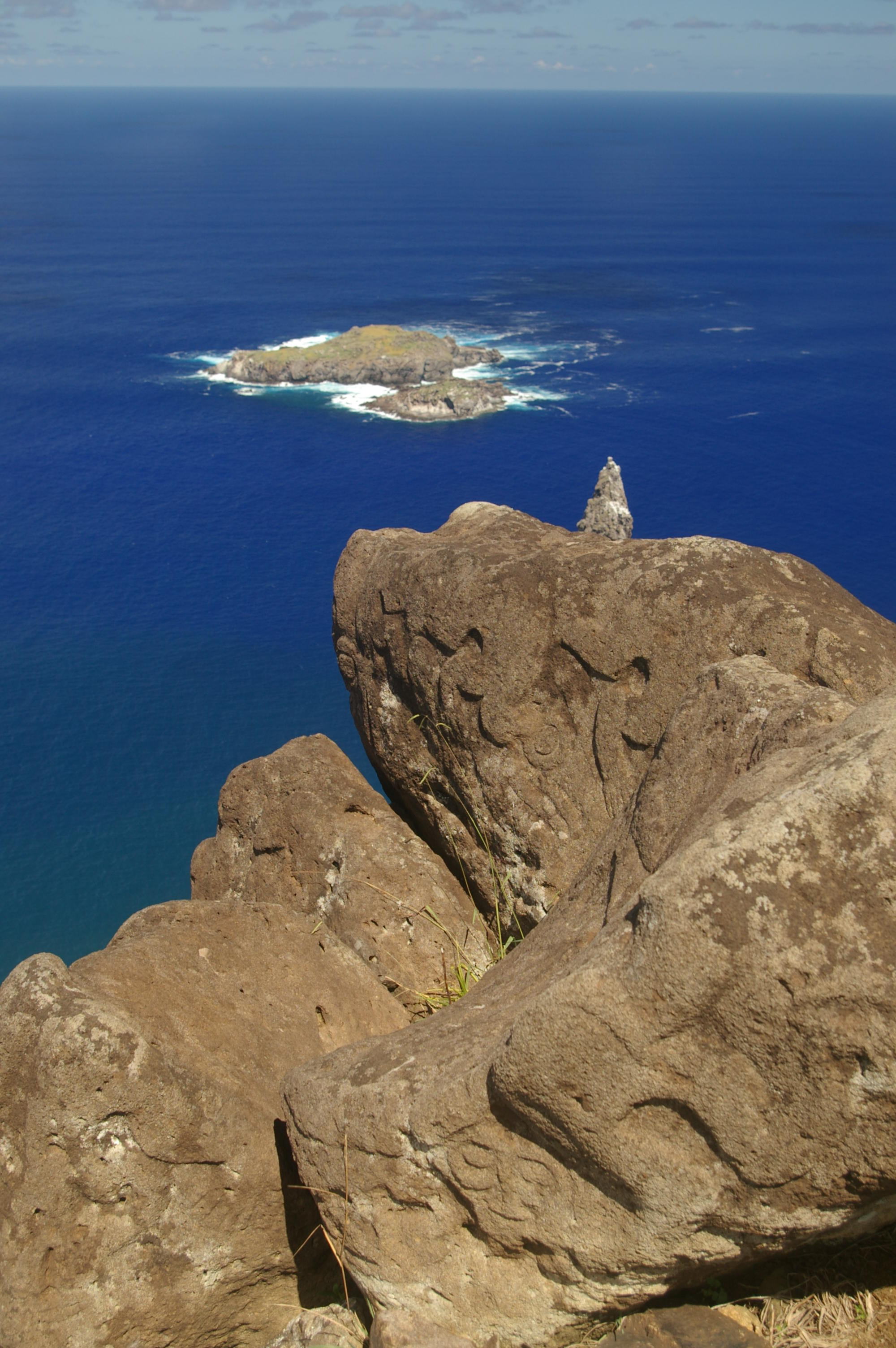
Petroglyphs on rocks at Orongo. Make-make at base and two birdmen higher up.

== Mythology ==
In the Rapa Nui mythology, the deity Makemake was the chief god of the bird-man cult; the other three deities associated with it were Hawa-tuu-take-take (the Chief of the eggs, a male god), his wife Vie Hoa, and another female deity named Vie Kenatea. Each of these four also had a servant god who was associated with them. The names of all eight would be chanted by contestants during the various rituals preceding the egg hunt.

== Bird-man religion ==
The identities of the contestants, all men of importance on the island, were revealed in prophecies by ivi-attua priests, who could be either men or women. Each contestant would then appoint one or sometimes two hopu, adult men of lesser status, who would be the ones to swim to Motu Nui carrying provisions in a bundle of reeds called a pora under one arm. They would each await the arrival of the first sooty terns, hoping to return with the first egg, whilst their sponsors waited for their return at the stone village of Orongo on the southwestern tip of Rapa Nui. The race was very dangerous, and many hopu were killed by sharks, by drowning, or by falling from cliff faces, though replacements were apparently easily available.

Once the first egg was collected, the finder would go to the highest point on Motu Nui and call out to the shore of the main island, announcing his benefactor by the benefactor's new name and telling him, "Go shave your head, you have got the egg!" The cry would be taken up by listeners at the shoreline, who would pass it up the cliffside to the contestants waiting in Orongo. The unsuccessful hopu would then collectively swim back to the main island while the egg-finder remained alone on Motu Nui and fasted; he would then swim back with the egg secured inside a reed basket tied to his forehead. On his reaching land, he would then climb the steep, rocky cliff face and present the egg to his patron (if it were still intact), who would have already shaved his head and painted it either white or red.

This successful contestant – not the hopu, but his sponsor – would then be declared the new tangata-manu, and would take the egg in his hand and lead a procession down the slope of Rano Kau to Anakena (if he was from the western clans) or Rano Raraku (if he was from the eastern clans). The new tangata-manu was entitled to gifts of food and other tributes and his clan would have sole rights to collect that season's harvest of wild bird eggs and fledglings from Motu Nui. He then would go into seclusion for a year in a special ceremonial house; he would be considered tapu for the next five months, and in that time would allow his nails to grow long and wear a headdress made of human hair. He would be expected to engage in no activity other than eating and sleeping during this time.

== Decline ==
The bird-man cult was ended by Christian missionaries in the 1860s. The origins of the cult are uncertain, as it is unknown whether it replaced the preceding Moai-based religion or had coexisted with it. However, archaeologist and anthropologist Katherine Routledge was able to collect the names of 86 tangata-manu during the 1913–15 Mana Expedition.

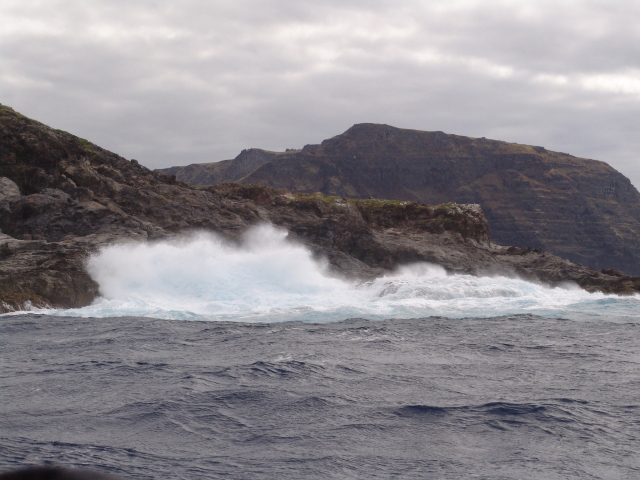
Bird-man Island coast

== In popular culture ==
- The band Rasputina's song "Oh Bring Back the Egg Unbroken" from the 2007 Oh Perilous World is about the tangata-manu traditions.
- The 1994 film Rapa Nui depicts a version of the race to Motu Nui.
