= Maher Island =

Island in Marie Byrd Land, Antarctica

- Location within Antarctica

Geography
- Location: Antarctica
- Coordinates: 72°58′S 126°22′W
- Length: 1 km (0.6 mi)

Administration
- Administered under the Antarctic Treaty System

Demographics
- Population: Uninhabited

Maher Island is a small horseshoe-shaped island lying 10 km (6.2 mi) north of the north-western end of Siple Island, off the coast of Marie Byrd Land, Antarctica. It is one of the three pieces of land closest to the Oceanic Pole of Inaccessibility, also known as 'Point Nemo', the other two being Ducie Island, one of the Pitcairn Islands, and Motu Nui near Easter Island. It has numerous areas of exposed rock and is mostly ice-free in summer.

== Discovery and naming ==
It was discovered and photographed from aircraft of U.S. Navy Operation Highjump, 1946–47, and was named by the Advisory Committee on Antarctic Names for Commander Eugene Maher, U.S. Navy, commanding officer of USS Glacier during Operation Deep Freeze, 1955–56.

== Important Bird Area ==
A 51 ha site, comprising the whole of the island, has been designated an Important Bird Area (IBA) by BirdLife International because it supports about 10,000 breeding pairs of Adélie penguins, as estimated by 2011 satellite imagery.

== See also ==
- List of Antarctic and Subantarctic islands
