= Sonia Haoa Cardinali =

Rapanui archaeologist

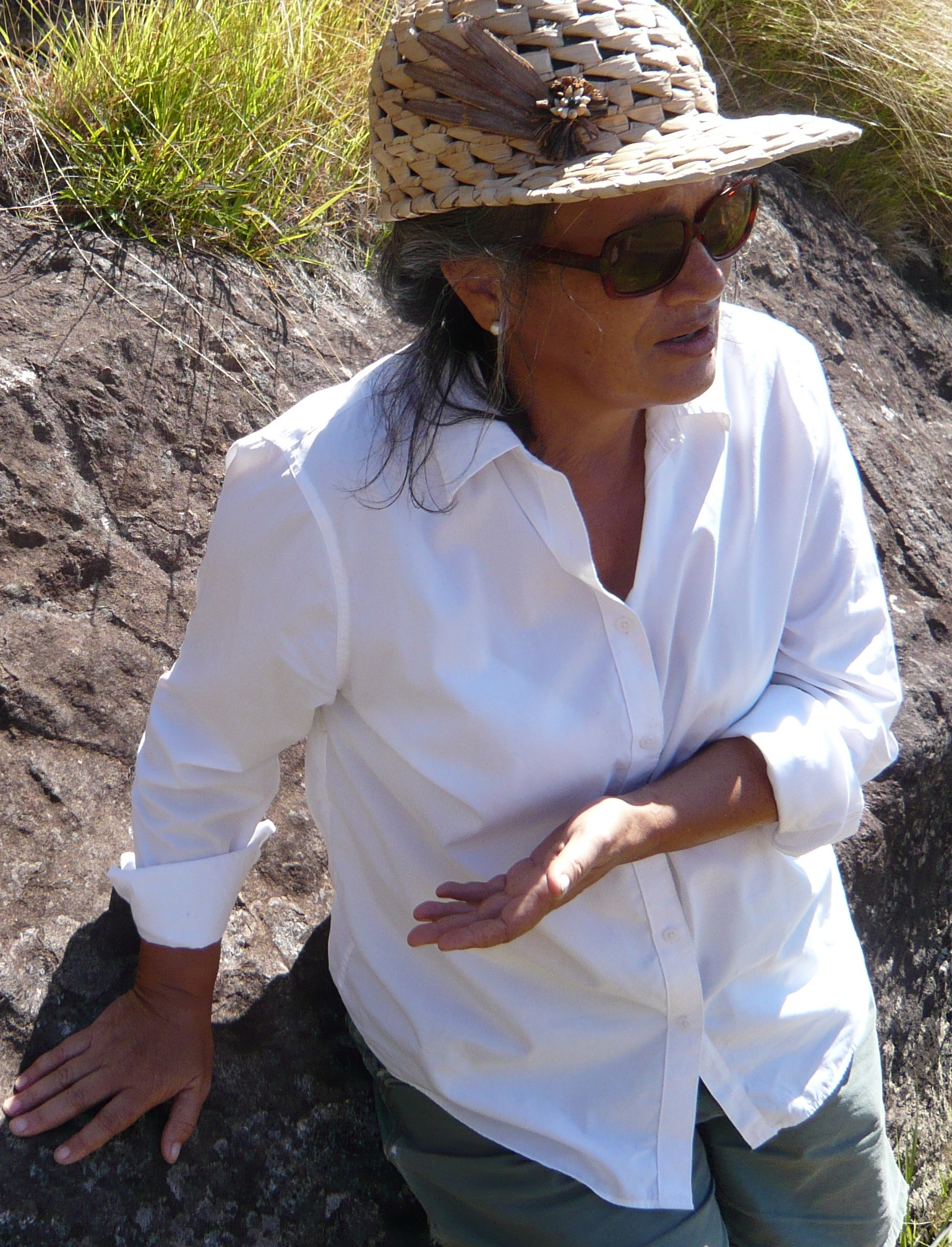
- Sonia Haoa Cardinali at Poike, Rapa Nui in March 2017
- Alma mater: University of Chile; University of Arizona
- Occupation: Archaeologist

Sonia Haoa Cardinali (born 1953) is a Rapanui archaeologist with the Mata Ki Te Rangi Foundation and coordinator of Easter Island's national monuments. She has made important contributions to understanding the subsistence and survival of the prehistoric inhabitants. Her findings challenge the view that the islanders caused the environmental and social collapse of the island.

== Early life and career ==
Haoa was born on Rapa Nui (Easter Island) in 1953. She was the second of the six children of Nicolás Haoa and Rosa Cardinali. Her parents sent her to Chile at the age of 11, and she was educated at the Liceo La Asunción de los Padres Maryknoll in the town of Talcahuano, in the south of Chile. Afterwards, she attended the University of Arizona for two years, before studying archaeology at the University of Chile. In 1975, she joined William Mulloy in the restoration works of the ceremonial village of Orongo.

== Archaeological investigations on Rapa Nui ==
Haoa has collaborated with many Easter Island specialists, including Gonzalo Figueroa, Katherine and Michael Orliac, Christopher Stevenson, Sergio Rapu, and the Norwegian explorer Thor Heyerdahl. It was while working with Rapu and Heyerdahl in the 1980s that Haoa discovered the first eye of one of the moai (giant prehistoric statues), demonstrating that the statues originally had inlaid eyes of shell and obsidian.

In 2009, Haoa and others established the Mata ki te Rangi Foundation with the support of Norwegian shipping magnate Fred Olsen. The aim of the foundation is to connect Easter Island to the rest of the Pacific through scientific research and culture. These efforts have been marked by an international conference of Pacific scholars held in Bali in 2016, and more recently by the International Conference on Early Pacific Migration and Easter Island, held on Easter Island in November 2018, attended by more than 140 researchers from all parts of the world.

With Christopher Stevenson, Haoa has described agricultural methods including lithic mulching and the use of rock gardens, used by the prehistoric Rapanui people to increase productivity and help moisture retention in the soil. The findings reveal careful and intensive land management, and challenge the view that the prehistoric Rapanui suffered an environmental collapse before the arrival of the Europeans in 1722.

Haoa's efforts, from recovery of archaeological skeletons to research and analyses, were instrumental in the comprehensive survey of Rapa Nui skeletal material by the anthropologists Vincent Stefan and George Gill. The studies have helped with understanding the origin and physical attributes of the prehistoric islanders. They have also helped challenge the widespread belief that the islanders engaged in wholesale warfare and cannibalism before European contacts in 1722.

Haoa's contributions to Rapa Nui archaeology and cultural heritage were acknowledged through the award of an honorary doctorate by Uppsala University in January 2019.

== Selected publications ==
=== Books ===
- Haoa Cardinali, Sonia; Ingersoll, Kathleen B.; Ingersoll Jr., Daniel W.; Stevenson, Christopher M., eds. (2017). Cultural and Environmental Change on Rapa Nui. Routledge (Taylor & Francis): Routledge Studies in Archaeology, Abingdon, Oxon.
- Stevenson, Christopher; Haoa Cardinali, Sonia. (2008). Prehistoric Rapa Nui Landscape and Settlement Archaeology at Hanga Ho'onu. Easter Island Foundation, Los Osos, CA.

=== Articles ===
- Horrocks, Mark; Baisden, Troy; Flenley, John; Feek, David; Love, Charles, Haoa-Cardinali, Sonia, González Nualart, Lilian; Edmunds Gorman, Tahira. (2017). Dryland Soils from Easter Island (Rapa Nui) Show Widespread Vegetation Clearance and Polynesian-Introduced Crops. Palynology, 41: 339–350. https://doi.org/10.1080/01916122.2016.1204566
- Mulrooney MA, Ladefoged TN, Stevenson CM, Haoa S (2010) Empirical assessment of a pre-European societal collapse on Rapa Nui (Easter Island). The Gotland Papers: Selected Papers from the VII International Conference on Easter Island and the Pacific: Migration, Identity, and Cultural Heritage, eds Wallin P, Martinsson-Wallin H (Gotland University Press, Gotland, Sweden), pp 141–154.
- Stevenson, Christopher M.; Ladefoged, Tegn N.; Haoa, Sonia. (2002). Productive strategies in an uncertain environment: Prehistoric agriculture on Easter Island. Rapa Nui Journal 16(1):17–22
- Stevenson, Christopher, M.; Puleston, Cedric, O.; Vitousek, Peter, M., Chadwick, Oliver, A.; Haoa, Sonia; Ladefoged, Thegn, N. (2015). Variation in Rapa Nui (Easter Island) land use indicates production and population peaks prior to European contact. PNAS, 112: 1025–1030. https://doi.org/10.1073/pnas.1420712112
