= Poike =

Extinct volcano in Easter Island

Coordinates: 27°05′31″S 109°15′00″W

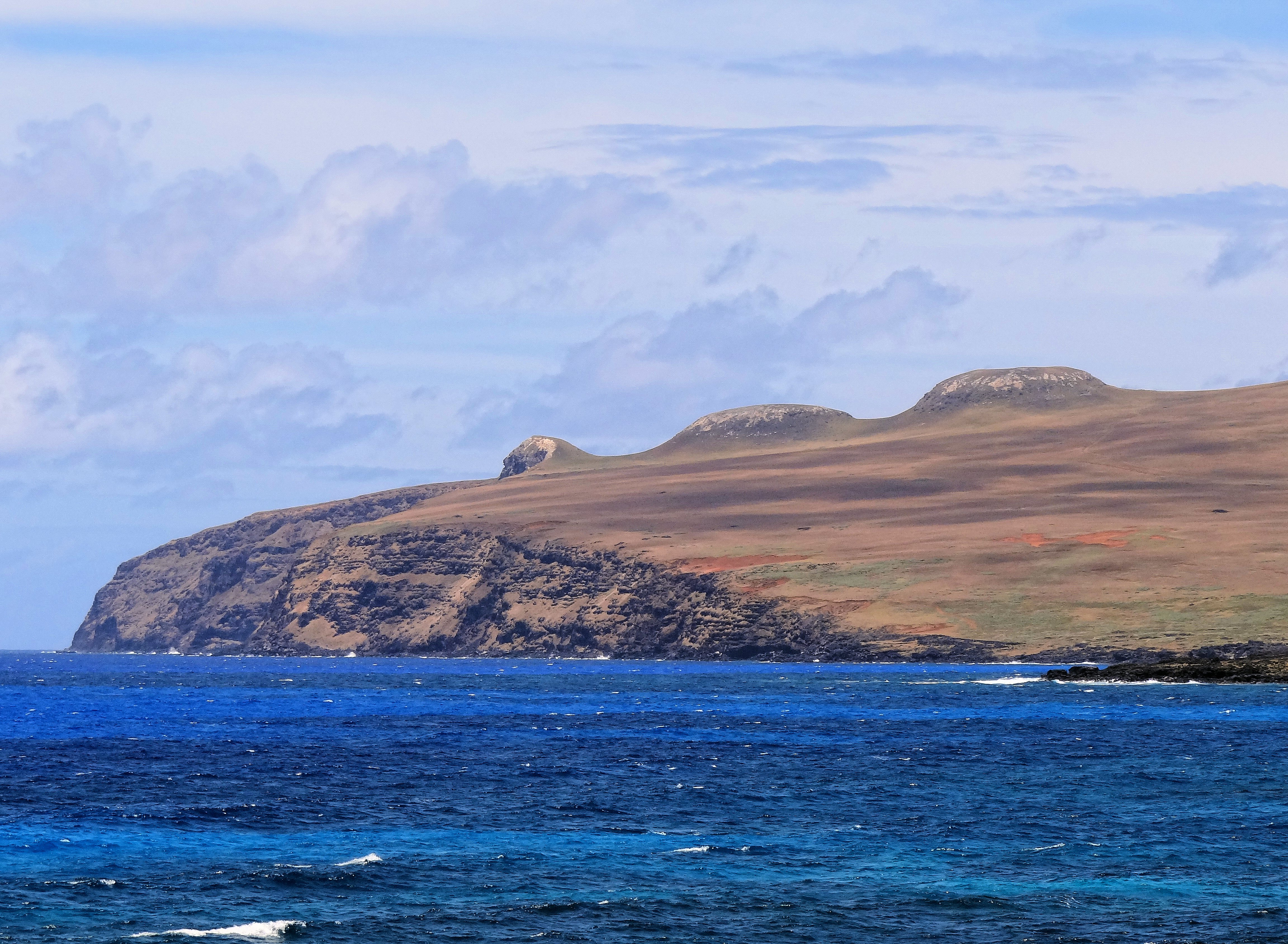
The north side of Poike seen from the west

Rapa Nui showing Poike at the eastern (right) side of the island

Poike is one of the three main extinct volcanoes that form Rapa Nui (Easter Island), a Chilean island in the Pacific Ocean. At 370 metres above sea level, Poike's peak is the island's second-highest point after the peak of the extinct volcano Terevaka.

Poike forms the eastern headland of Rapa Nui. An abrupt cliff known as the "Poike ditch" spans the island at the boundary between the respective lava flows from Poike and Terevaka. As the oldest of the island's three main volcanoes, Poike is the most weathered with relatively stoneless soil.

== See also ==
- List of volcanoes in Chile
- List of volcanoes in Pacific Ocean
