= Orongo =

Stone village and ceremonial center on Easter Island

Coordinates: 27°11′22″S 109°26′33″W

Map of the location of ꞌOrongo on Easter Island

Orongo (Rapa Nui: Oroŋo, pronounced [oˈɾoŋo]; Spanish pronunciation: [oˈɾoŋgo]) is a stone village and ceremonial center at the southwestern tip of Rapa Nui (Easter Island). It consists of a collection of low, sod-covered, windowless, round-walled buildings with even lower doors positioned on the high south-westerly tip of the large volcanic caldera called Rano Kau. Below Orongo on one side a 300-meter barren cliff face drops down to the ocean; on the other, a more gentle but still very steep grassy slope leads down to a freshwater marsh inside the high caldera.

In 1974 UNESCO sponsored a project to restore Orongo. Under the supervision of William Mulloy, with the support of Rapanui archaeologist Sonia Haoa Cardinali, the first half of the ceremonial village's 53 stone masonry houses was investigated and restored in 1974. The remainder was completed in 1976 and subsequently investigated in 1985 and again in 1995. Orongo now has World Heritage status as part of the Rapa Nui National Park.

== History ==
Between the 18th and mid-19th centuries Orongo was the centre of a birdman cult whose defining ritual was an annual race to bring the first manutara (sooty tern) egg back undamaged from the nearby islet of Motu Nui to Orongo. The race was very dangerous, and hunters often fell to their deaths from the cliff face or were killed by sharks. The site has numerous petroglyphs, mainly of tangata manu (birdmen), which may have been carved to commemorate some of the winners of this race.

In the 1860s, most of the Rapa Nui islanders died of disease or were enslaved, and when the survivors were converted to Christianity, Orongo fell into disuse. In 1868, the crew of HMS Topaze removed the huge basalt moai known as Hoa Hakananai'a from Orongo. It is now housed in the British Museum.

The site of Orongo was included in the 1996 World Monuments Watch by the World Monuments Fund, and listed again four years later, in 2000. The threat was soil erosion, caused by rainfall and exacerbated by foot traffic. After 2000, the organization helped devise a site management plan with support from American Express, and in December 2009 more funding was announced for the construction of a sustainable visitor center.

Houses and location of Orongo
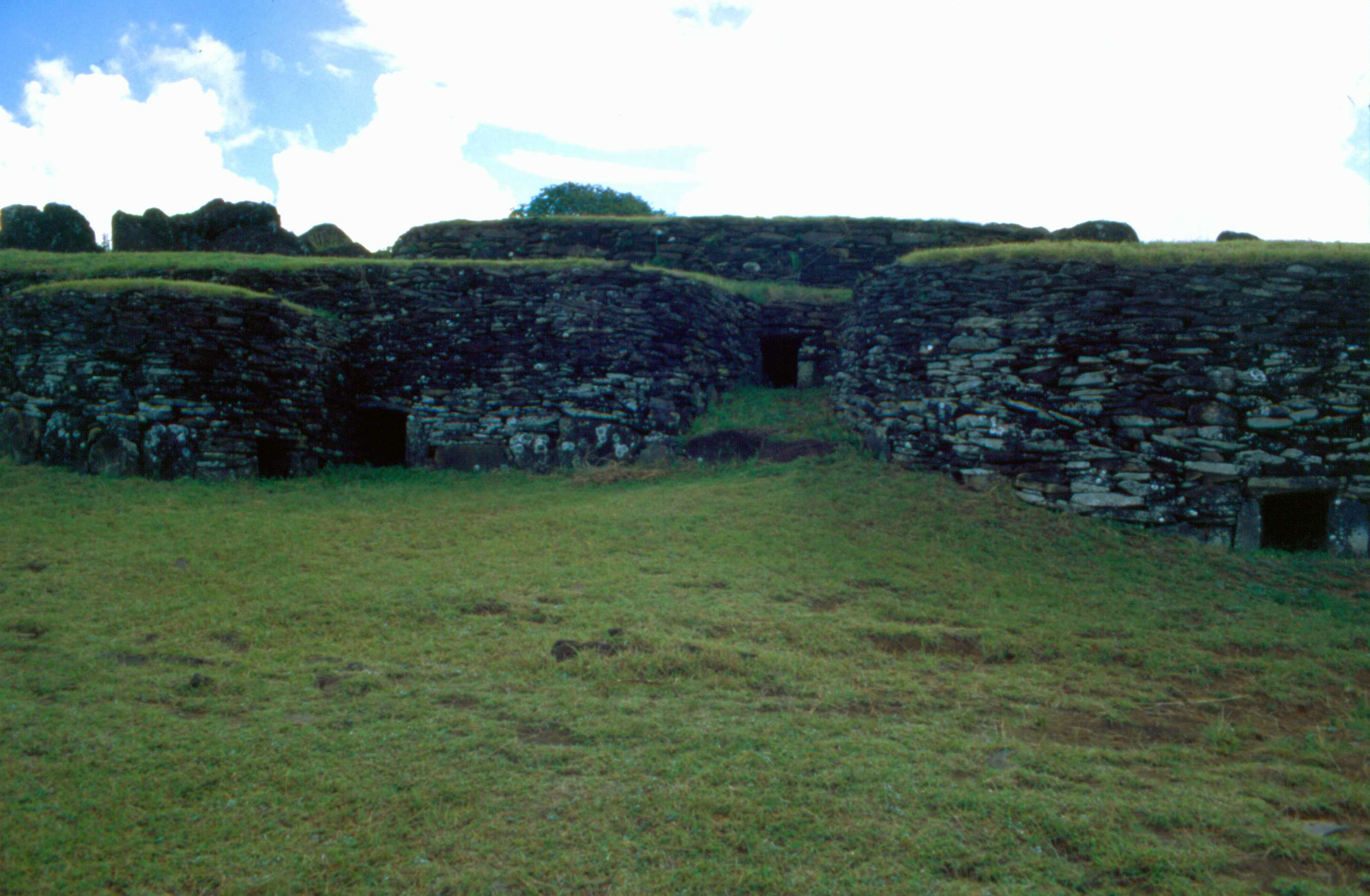
Restored stone houses at Orongo

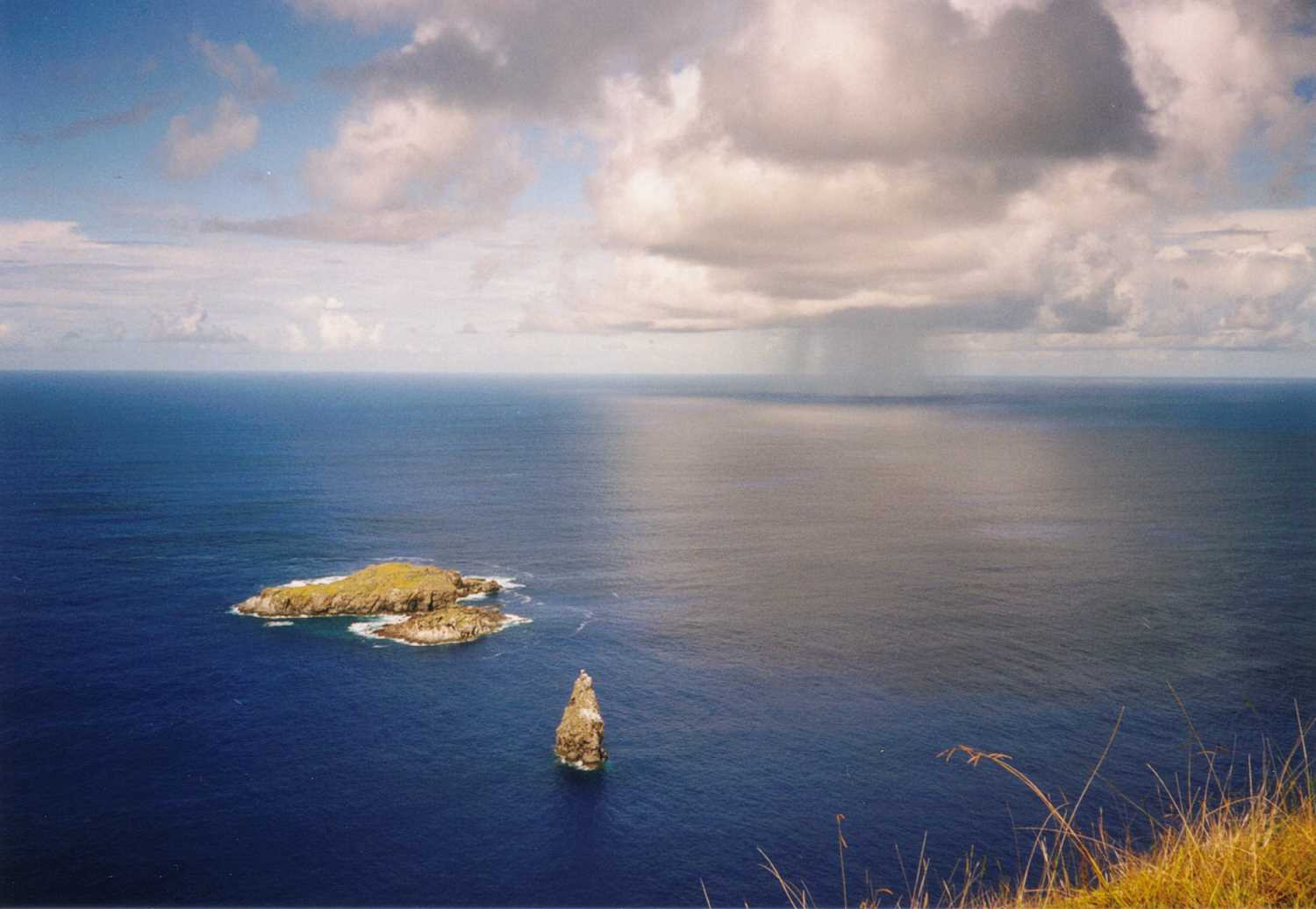
View from Orongo out to sea. Motu Nui, with the smaller Motu Iti in front and the isolated sea stack of Motu Kau Kau between them and the viewer. Picture taken during January 2004, from Orongo at the Rano Kau volcano, around 250 meters (820 feet) above sea level.

Easter Island map showing Rano Kau, Motu Nui, Orongo, and Mataveri

== See also ==
- Rapa Nui mythology

== Resources ==
- Mulloy, William. Investigation and Restoration of the Ceremonial Center of Orongo. International Fund for Monuments Bulletin No. 4. New York (1975).
- Mulloy, W.T., and S.R. Fischer. 1993. Easter Island Studies: Contributions to the History of Rapanui in Memory of William T. Mulloy. Oxford: Oxbow Books.
- Routledge, Katherine Pease (Scouresby). 1919. The Mystery of Easter Island; the Story of an Expedition. London, Aylesbury, Printed for the author by Hazell, Watson and Viney. ISBN 0-932813-48-8 (1998 US reprint)
