= Terevaka =

Extinct volcano in Easter Island

Mauŋa Terevaka
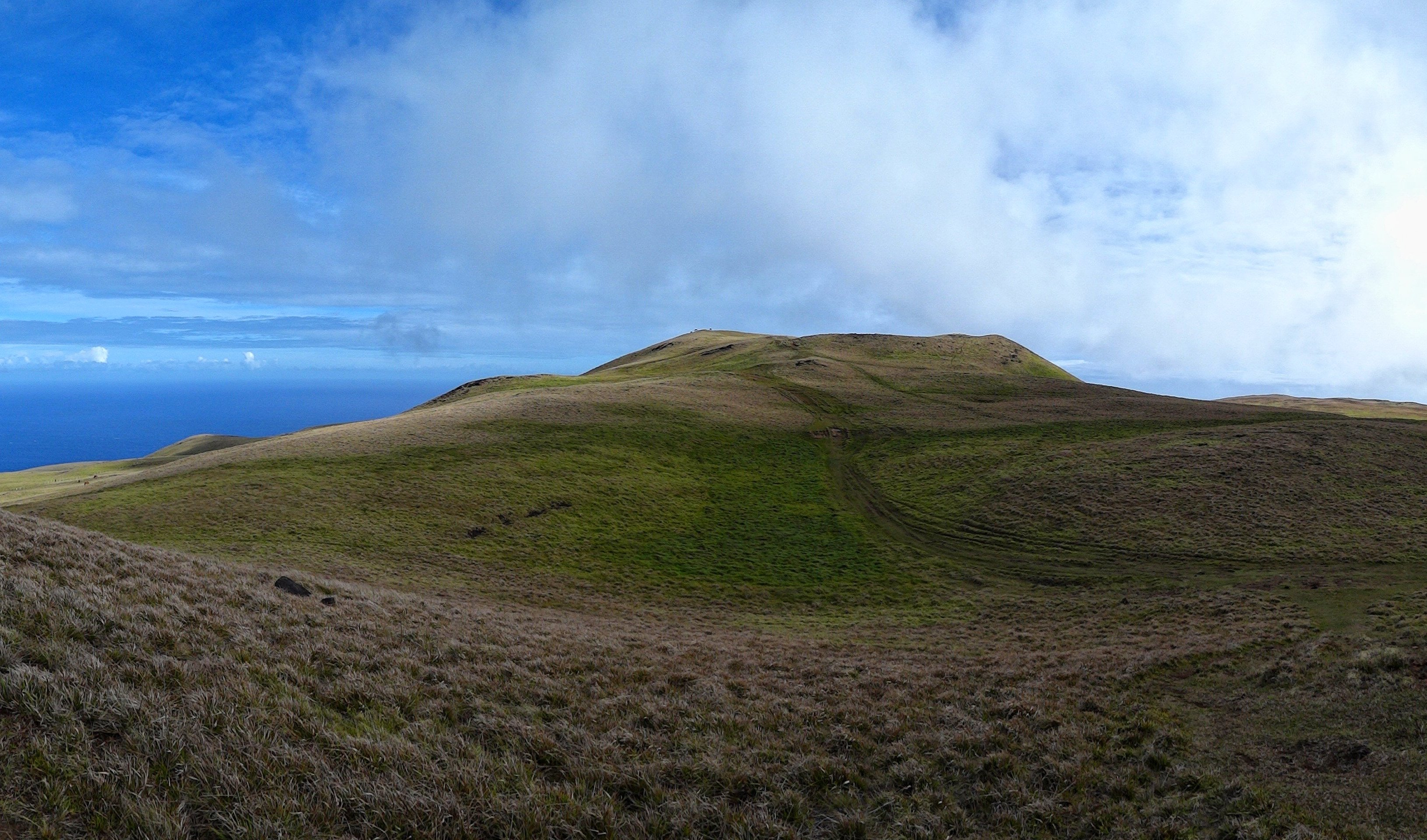

Highest point
- Elevation: 1,664 ft (507 m)
- Prominence: 1,664 ft (507 m)
- Listing: World's most isolated peaks 12th
- Coordinates: 27°5′4″S 109°22′46″W

Geography
- Location: Easter Island

Geology
- Mountain type: Shield volcano
- Last eruption: Pleistocene, less than 110,000 years ago

Mauŋa Terevaka (Rapa Nui: [ˈmauŋa teɾeˈvaka], Spanish: [ˈmauŋɡa teɾeˈβaka]) is the largest, tallest (507.41 m (1,664.73 ft)) and youngest of three main extinct volcanoes that form Easter Island. Several smaller volcanic cones and craters dot its slopes, including a crater hosting one of the island's three lakes, Rano Aroi.

While Terevaka forms the bulk of Easter Island, the island has two older volcanic peaks: Poike which forms the eastern headland and Rano Kau the southern. Terevaka last erupted in the Pleistocene and is less than 400,000 years old. Its lava field at Roiho has been dated at between 110,000 and 150,000 years old.

Terevaka is the 12th most topographically isolated summit on Earth.

== Geography ==
It accounts for around 80% of the island's surface, and is surrounded by active cliffs and gentle hills with cinder cone formations. The Mauŋa Terevaka fissure system is considered to have two distinct fissures, with the primary one running from Hanga Oteo to Maunga Tangaroa for about 12 km. On the eastern slope of Terevaka in the Vaimata sector the fissures resemble linear ravines, but there are no deep soil disturbances or lateral cracking, and shows signs of intense erosion from precipitation.

== Hiking ==
Terevaka can be climbed via a trail that starts next to the moai at Ahu Akivi. Terevaka's route is considered more physically demanding than the other slopes of the volcanoes of the Heritage Route, and it is classified as intermediate. The route is known to have minimal visibility on days with rain, so it is often shut off.

== Gallery ==
Map of Rapa Nui showing Terevaka, Poike and Rano Kau

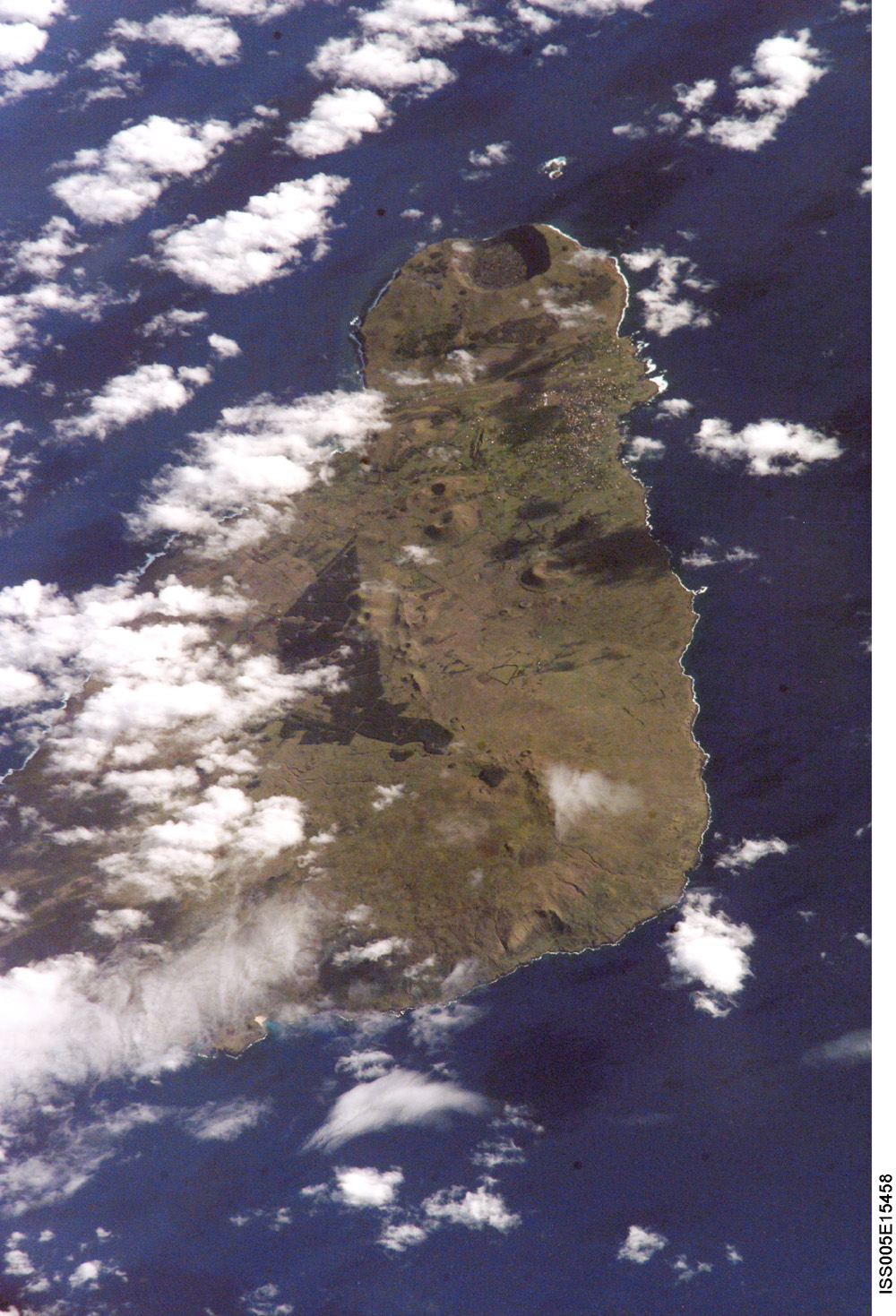
Terevaka from space with Hanga Roa above and Rano Kau at top – a west up photo from Nasa

== See also ==
- List of volcanoes in Chile
- List of islands by highest point
- Topographic isolation
