= Motu Nui =

Islet near Easter Island, national monument of Chile

Coordinates: 27°12′05″S 109°27′10″W

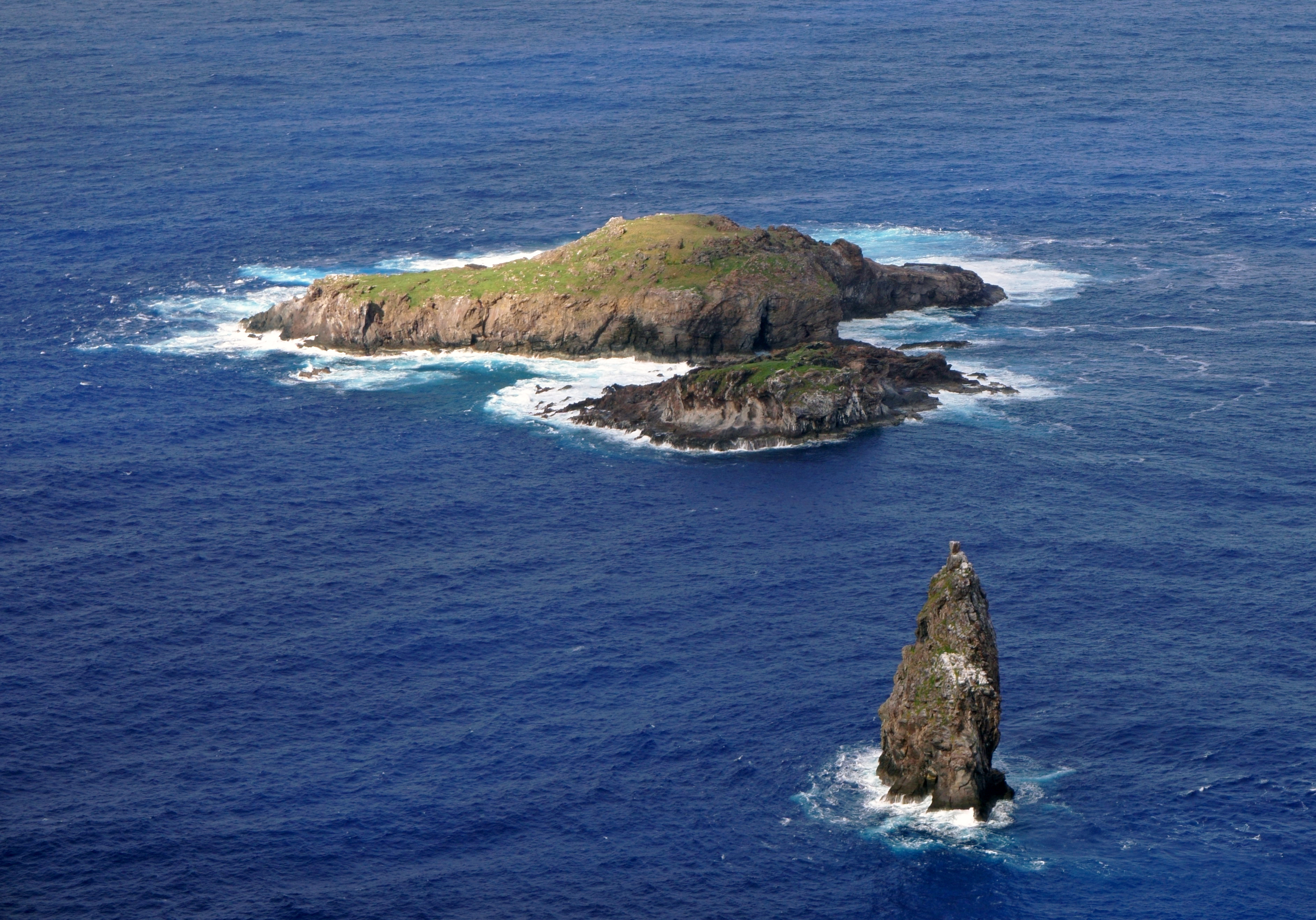
Motu Nui, with the smaller Motu Iti and the sea stack Motu Kao Kao. Photo taken in September 2018 from Orongo, on the Rano Kau volcano, approximately 250 meters (820 feet) above sea level

Motu Nui is the largest of the islets located off the southwestern coast of Easter Island (Rapa Nui) and constitutes the westernmost point of Chile. Covering an area of 3.9 hectares, it is the summit of a submerged volcanic mountain that rises over 2,000 meters from the seafloor. Motu Nui is one of the five satellite islets of Easter Island and is notable for being among the three closest landmasses to Point Nemo, the oceanic pole of inaccessibility. The other two are Ducie Island (Pitcairn Islands) and Maher Island (Antarctica).

Map showing Motu Nui, the largest of three small islets located off the southwestern tip of Rapa Nui (bottom left corner of the map)

Historically, Motu Nui played a central role in the Tangata manu ("bird-man") cult, a religious tradition that developed after the moai-building period and before the widespread adoption of Christianity in the 1860s. Each year, representatives (Hopu) from different clans would swim to Motu Nui to await the arrival of the manutara (sooty tern). The first Hopu to retrieve an egg would return to Easter Island and present it to his patron at Orongo, a ceremonial village on the rim of the Rano Kau crater. The sponsor would then be declared the Tangata manu and hold ritual authority for one year. The ritual was hazardous, with frequent fatalities from shark attacks or falls. The victorious clan gained exclusive rights to collect seabird eggs and chicks from the islets. The last known competition took place in 1888.

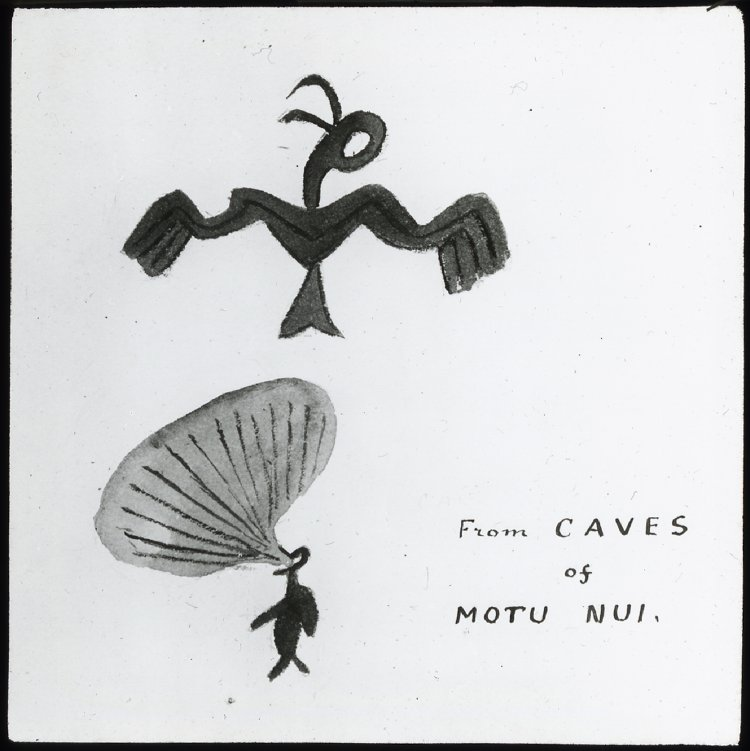
Katherine Routledge's drawings of cave images on Motu Nui

The Routledge expedition of 1914 conducted a scientific survey of Motu Nui and recorded six species of nesting seabirds in addition to the sooty tern. They also documented two caves formerly used during the Tangata manu ritual, one for sheltering the Hopu and another that housed Moai Maea, a small moai known as "The Boundary of the Land", which had already been removed to the Pitt Rivers Museum in Oxford, England.

Nearby islets include Motu Kao Kao, a sea stack rising approximately 20 meters above sea level, and Motu Iti. All three are home to seabird populations. The name Motu Nui means "large island" in the Rapa Nui language, where motu means "islet".

Today, the islets are visited via small boat tours departing from Hanga Roa, the island's main town. The waters surrounding Motu Nui are a popular destination for scuba diving, known for their clear visibility and marine biodiversity. Shark populations, once more abundant, have declined significantly due to overfishing.
