= Rano Kau =

Dormant volcano in Easter Island

Coordinates: 27°11′12.8″S 109°26′08.4″W

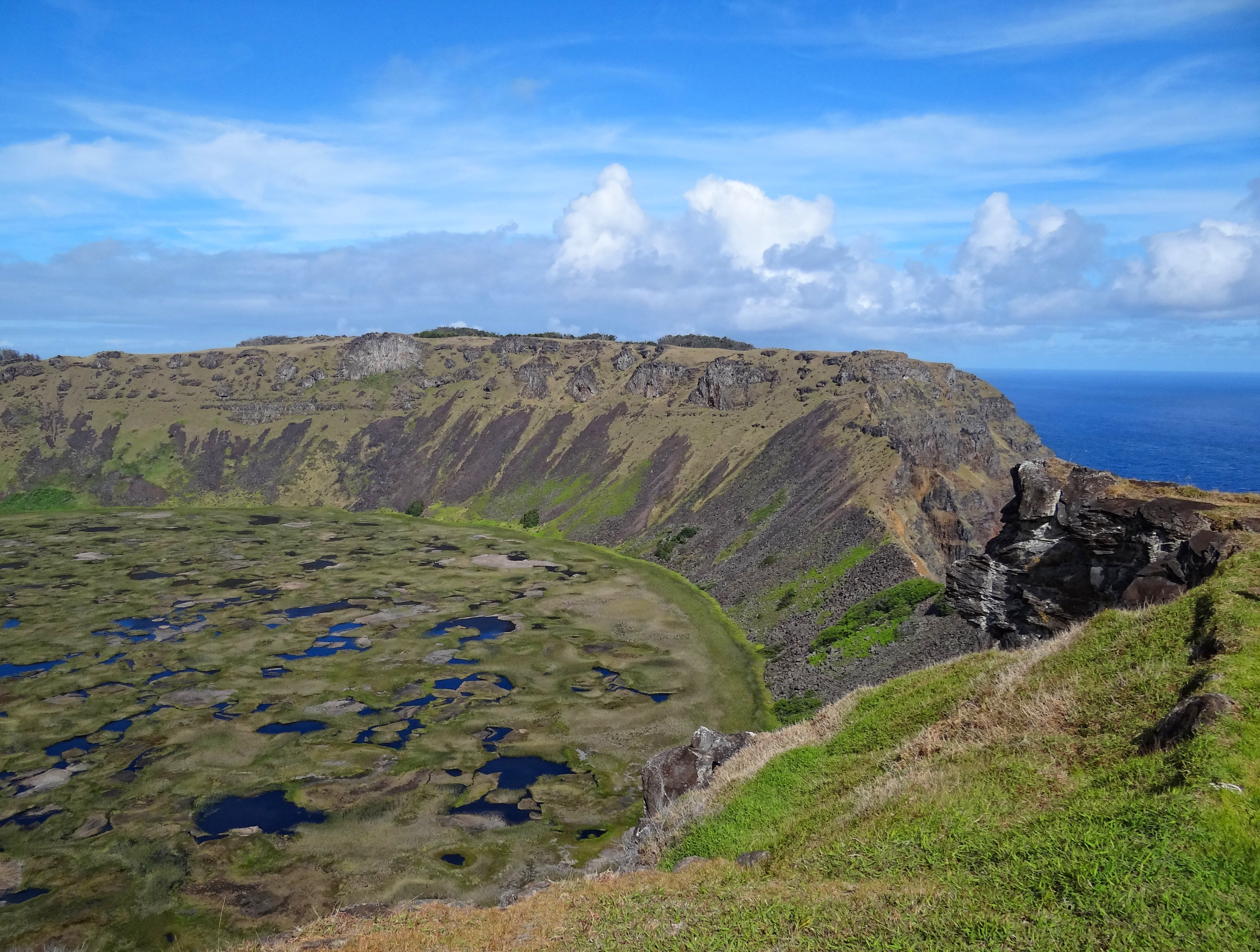
View of Rano Kau from near Orongo, showing a gap at the southern end of the crater wall

Rano Kau (Rapa Nui: [ˈɾano ˈkau], Spanish: [ˈrano ˈkau]) is a 324 m (1,063 ft) tall extinct volcano that forms the southwestern headland of Easter Island, a Chilean island in the Pacific Ocean. It was formed by basaltic lava flows in the Pleistocene with its youngest rocks dated at between 150,000 and 210,000 years ago.

== Toponymy ==
Rano Kau is a name derived from the Rapa Nui language that describes its natural features. “Rano” refers to a volcano that contains water, specifically a crater with a lake inside. The word “Kau” conveys meanings such as “abundance of water” and “large” or “broad.” Together, the name can be understood as “a wide volcano filled with water.”

== Crater ==
Map showing the location of Rano Kau along with the volcanoes Terevaka and Poike

Rano Kau has a crater lake which is one of the island's only three natural bodies of fresh water. The lake is located approximately 100 metres (330 ft) above sea level, but is more than 200 metres (660 ft) below the highest of the crater's ridges. The volcanic cone is largely surrounded by water, and much of it has been eroded back to form high sea cliffs which at one point (te kari kari) have started to bite into the crater wall. The inside walls of the crater are sloped at an angle of between 65° (steepest, near the crest) and 45° (gentlest, at the lake shore). From the ruins of the ceremonial village of Orongo the cliff face drops to the southwest at an angle of 50° to the sea shore some 300 metres (980 ft) below. On its northern side, the volcano slopes down to Mataveri International Airport.

Rano Kau is in the World Heritage Site of Rapa Nui National Park and gives its name to one of the seven sections of the park. The principal archaeological site on Rano Kau is the ruined ceremonial village of Orongo which is located at the point where the sea cliff and inner crater wall converge. One ahu with several moai was recorded on the cliffs at Rano Kau in the 1880s, but had fallen to the beach by the time of the Routledge expedition in 1914.

In addition to basalt, it contains several other igneous rocks including obsidian (for which it was one of the major sources for the island's stoneworkers) and pumice.

The crater is almost a mile across and has its own microclimate. Sheltered from the winds that wet most of the rest of the island, figs and vines flourish at Rano Kau. The inner slope was the site of the last toromiro tree in the wild until the specimen was chopped down for firewood in 1960.

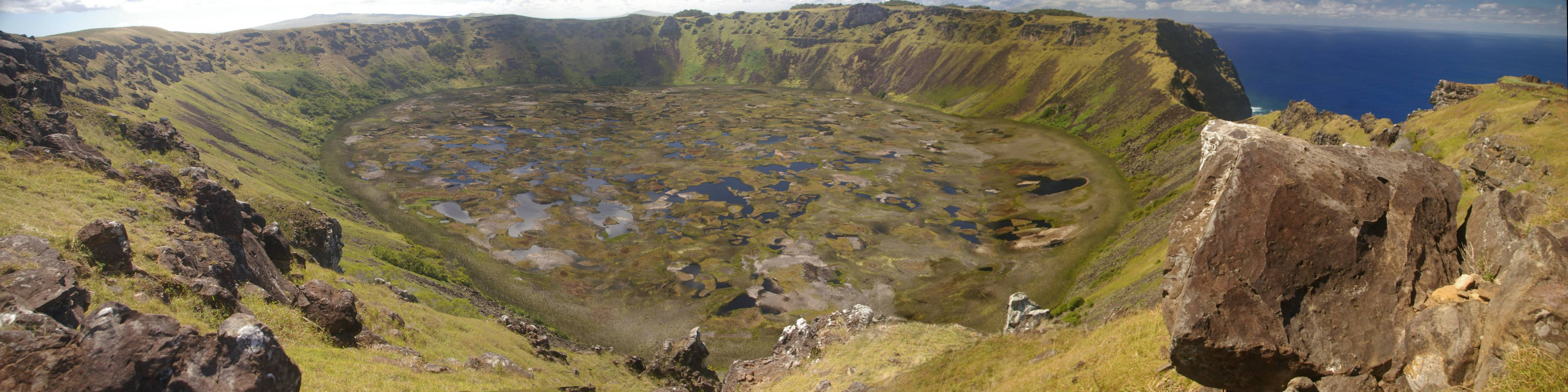
Crater lake of Rano Kau, with Orongo at far right

== Geothermal activity ==
At some point in the early twentieth century, the island's manager took a photograph of steam coming out of the crater wall.

== See also ==
- List of volcanoes in Chile
- Sirolimus
