= Sebastian Englert =

Father Sebastian Englert OFM Cap.
- Father Sebastian and William Mulloy at the steps of the church in Hanga Roa after Mass. Father Sebastian is wearing the white habit of Capuchin Franciscan missionaries.

Personal life
- Born: Anton Franz Englert; November 17, 1888 Dillingen, Bavaria
- Died: January 8, 1969 (aged 80) New Orleans, Louisiana, United States
- Known for: Missionary work on Rapa Nui

Religious life
- Religion: Roman Catholic
- Order: Capuchin Franciscan
- Profession: Priest, missionary, linguist
- Ordination: 1912

Senior posting
- Based in: Apostolic Vicariate of Araucanía; Rapa Nui

Father Sebastian Englert OFM Cap., (November 17, 1888 – January 8, 1969) was a Capuchin Franciscan friar, Roman Catholic priest, missionary, linguist and ethnologist from Germany. He is known for his pioneering work on Easter Island, where the Father Sebastian Englert Anthropological Museum is named after him.

== Early life in Bavaria ==
Born Anton Franz Englert in Dillingen, Bavaria, Father Sebastian spent his school days in Eichstätt and Burghausen.

In 1907, he entered the novitiate of the Order of Friars Minor Capuchin and received the religious name Sebastian. He undertook his canonical studies in philosophy and theology in the Capuchin studium of Dillingen, and was ordained to the priesthood in 1912.

During the First World War, Father Sebastian served as a chaplain in the German Army in France and Belgium, and after the war he worked for five years as a parish priest in the Schwabing district of Munich. In 1922, he went at his own request as a missionary to the Mapuche at Villarrica and Pucón in Southern Chile.

== Missionary and scientific activity in Chile ==
Father Sebastian served in the Apostolic Vicariate of the Araucanía in Villarrica and Pucón, which at the time was administered almost entirely by Capuchins. There, in addition to his pastoral duties, he conducted ethnological and linguistic research into Mapuche culture and the Mapudungun language. From 1934 to 1938, he published studies in Araucanian literature, ethnology and folklore. During this period, his linguistic studies included an investigation of the relationship of Quechua and Aymara to the Mapuche language.

== Rapa Nui ==
From 1935 for more than 30 years until his death, Father Sebastian worked as a missionary priest on Rapa Nui (Easter Island). At the time, he was perhaps the only non-Rapa Nui to have mastered their language. Although he celebrated Mass in Latin, he preached, heard confessions and catechized the faithful in the Rapa Nui language. He also translated popular Catholic devotions into Rapa Nui and encouraged native religious song. In 1964, he produced a history of the early activity of the French Sacred Hearts missionaries who first evangelized the island.

Given the isolation of Rapa Nui during the period before air travel, Father Sebastian researched the language, ethnology and anthropology of Easter Island. His knowledge of Rapa Nui culture and prehistory impressed the scientific staff of the Norwegian Archaeological Expedition of 1955. William Mulloy, a member of that expedition, writes:

"I retain a sharp memory of a day shortly after our arrival, when he was asked to summarize his views of the local prehistory in a lecture to the expedition archaeologists. He presented a beautifully organized exposition based largely on his interpretations of painstakingly collected local genealogies and traditions. I wrote down everything I could..."

Father Sebastian published several books, the most important being La tierra de Hotu Matu'a (The Land of Hotu Matu'a) a 1948 study of the history, archaeology, anthropology, and language of Easter Island. He described numerous "Mapuche - Rapa Nui cognates". Among these are the Mapuche/Rapa Nui words toki/toki (axe), kuri/uri (black) and piti/iti (little). His research is best known to English-speakers through radio broadcasts for Chilean naval personnel in Antarctica, published in the United States as Island at the Center of the World: New Light on Easter Island.

Father Sebastian arrived intending to stay only a short time on the island, but in February 1936 he received a letter, via a visiting ship of the Chilean Navy, from his superior, Bishop Edwards, asking him to stay for two months more, which he did. However, it was almost a year until the next ship arrived, in January 1937. In that time he had revitalized the island's church, and had himself become attached to the island. The ship carried another letter from Bishop Edwards, appointing Father Sebastian as priest of Easter Island by attaching it to the "Apostolic Vicariate of Araucania".

He was "strict, authoritarian and patriarchal" with the islanders, supported the Chilean authorities in making it difficult for islanders to travel, and publicly censured churchgoers in his sermons, based on information they gave him when privately confessing their sins, adversely affecting their ability to work and to buy imported goods, both of which were controlled by the state-backed island company. In historian Steven Roger Fischer's view, this may have contributed to the failure of the islanders to "internalize Catholicism fully during those crucial development years."

Because of his work for the island's people, especially its lepers, Thor Heyerdahl, leader of the Norwegian Archaeological Expedition, called Father Sebastian the "uncrowned king of Easter Island." In 1963, Fr. Sebastian was awarded the Bundesverdienstkreuz (Federal Cross of Merit) First Class by the Federal Republic of Germany. He died in New Orleans, Louisiana in 1969 during a lecture tour of the United States. His remains were returned to Rapa Nui and interred in the cemetery in the Tahai district, but were later transferred to the site of Holy Cross Church in Hanga Roa.

In his will, he left all his books, his writings and his collection of native artifacts to the Government of Chile with the intention of forming a museum, but it wasn't until 1994 that the Father Sebastian Englert Anthropological Museum (MAPSE) was opened under the Chilean Directorate of Libraries, Archives and Museums (DiBAM). His papers, along with those of other researchers in Rapanui culture, are in the Biblioteca William Mulloy, which is administered by MAPSE.

== Publications ==
- Englert, S. 2004. La tierra de Hotu Matu'a: historia y etnología de la Isla de Pascua: gramática y diccionario del antiguo idioma de Isla de Pascua. 9th ed. Santiago de Chile: Editorial Universitaria.
- Englert, S. 1980. Leyendas de Isla de Pascua: textos bilingües. Santiago de Chile: Ediciones de la Universidad de Chile.
- Englert, S. 1978. Idioma rapanui: gramática y diccionario del antiguo idioma de la Isla de Pascua. Santiago de Chile: Universidad de Chile.
- Englert, S. 1977. Diccionario Rapanui-Español. New York: AMS Press.
- Englert, S. 1970. Island at the Center of the World; New Light on Easter Island. Translated and edited by William Mulloy. New York: Scribner.
- Englert, S. 1964. Primer siglo cristiano de la Isla de Pascua, 1864-1964. Villarrica, Chile: Escuela Lito-Tipográfica Salesiana “La Gratitud Nacional”.
- Englert, S. 1938. Diccionario Rapanui-Español redactado en la Isla de Pascua, por p. Sebastián Englert, Mis. Cap. Santiago de Chile: Prensas de la Universidad de Chile.
- Englert, S., and M. Buschkühl. 1988. Missionsgeschichte der Osterinsel: Pater Sebastian Englert O.F.M.Cap. (1888-1969) zum 100. Geburtstag. Ausstellung, Dezember 1988-März 1989. Eichstätt: Universitätsbibliothek.
