= Carlyle Shreeve Smith =

- Born: March 8, 1915; Great Neck, New York, U.S.
- Died: December 13, 1993 (aged 78); Kansas City, Missouri, U.S.
- Other names: Carl
- Years active: 1938–1993
- Partner: Judith Pogany (m. 1942)
- Children: 2
- Awards: J. C. Harrington Award (1989)

Carlyle Shreeve Smith (March 8, 1915 – December 13, 1993) was an American archaeologist. Smith's research interests focused on archaeology of the Great Plains and Hudson Valley regions of the United States; Easter Island and the Marquesas Islands in the Pacific Ocean; and history of the firearm.

== Early life and education ==
Carlyle Shreeve Smith was born on March 8, 1915, in Great Neck, New York, to Harold William Smith and Lulu Arrandale Allen. He had no siblings. Smith's father, originally an electrician, later became chief of police and postmaster of Great Neck. His interest in archaeology first began in high school and continued through college.

Smith attended Columbia College, Columbia University, earning his undergraduate degree in geology in 1938; William Duncan Strong encouraged him to pursue archaeology for his graduate studies. Over the next two years, Smith participated in fieldwork in North Dakota and Nebraska alongside Strong and Ralph Solecki, his first exposure to Great Plains archaeology. In 1940, he assisted Mary Butler Lewis with summer fieldwork in New York's Hudson Valley before travelling to Louisiana to study pottery seriation over the next year. His postgraduate studies at Columbia were paused during World War II while he served in the U.S. Army Air Forces until 1946. He subsequently completed his PhD in 1949 with his dissertation "The Archaeology of Coastal New York".

== Career ==
In 1947, while still completing his PhD, Smith accepted his first job for the University of Kansas (KU), where he would spend the rest of his career. This first job assistant professor of anthropology and an assistant museum curator for KU's Natural History Museum. He was promoted to associate level in 1954 and then received the full title of professor and curator in 1960. While at KU, Smith was frequently confused for another professor with a similar name, Carlyle Henry Smith, who had arrived at KU weeks prior to Carlyle Shreeve Smith's arrival.

Smith carried out significant excavations across the Great Plains between 1947 and 1980, beginning with his initial fieldwork while still an undergraduate at Columbia College. These sites primarily focused on the post-contact period. Between 1948 and 1950, he studied several sites in Kansas, including those in the vicinity of Kanopolis Lake, in Rice County, and the Kansas Monument site in Republic County. In 1950, Smith began focusing on sites in South Dakota, including Talking Crow, for which his research became a cornerstone of Northern Plains archaeology. Other sites Smith excavated include the Deerfly, Spain, Stricker, and Two Fly sites. He also studied and published several works on firearms found in historic Great Plains sites.

In 1955, Norwegian archaeologist Thor Heyerdahl invited Smith on a year-long expedition to Easter Island and other Eastern Pacific islands. The team, which also included William Mulloy, Edwin Ferdon, Gonzalo Figueroa Garcia Huidobro, and Arne Skjølsvold, excavated multiple sites in the region and published their findings in Reports of the Norwegian Archaeological Expedition to Easter Island and the East Pacific in 1961 and 1965; Smith wrote six of the eighteen archaeological articles in the anthology's first volume and two of the ten reports in the second volume. In 1963, Smith brought his family on a five-month fieldwork trip of Hiva Oa in the Marquesas Islands. He returned to Easter Island several times over the next decade as a consultant and tour guide for cruise and travel agencies.

Smith was assistant editor of American Antiquity from 1949 to 1955 and served as the Society for American Archaeology's first vice president. From 1961 to 164, he served on the Division of Behavioral Science for the National Academy of Science's National Research Council. From 1970 to 1983 he was on the Kansas Historical Sites Board of Review.

When KU established its new Museum of Anthropology in 1968, Smith was named its research associate. He expanded its collections considerably with his own donations and oversaw the museum's movement to a dedicated space in Spooner Hall. Following his 1981 retirement, Smith carried on as professor and curator emeritus.

== Personal life ==
During his World War II service, Smith married Judith Pogany in 1942. The couple had two children together.

Smith died on December 13, 1993, in Kansas City, of complications following heart bypass surgery.

== Awards and honors ==
The Nassau County Museum of Natural History named their laboratories after Smith in 1967. He was awarded a Doctor of Humane Letters from the University of South Dakota in 1979. He received the J. C. Harrington Award in 1989.
