= Gonzalo Figueroa Garcia Huidobro =

Gonzalo Figueroa
- Born: February 4, 1931; Santiago, Chile
- Died: May 20, 2008 (aged 77); Santiago, Chile
- Education: University of Chile
- Occupation: Archaeologist
- Spouse(s): Christiane Cassel (predeceased), Maria Angelica Schade (separated)
- Children: two sons, two daughters

Gonzalo Figueroa Garcia Huidobro (February 4, 1931 – May 20, 2008), often referred to simply as Gonzalo Figueroa, was an archaeologist and authority on the conservation of the archaeological heritage of Rapa Nui (Easter Island). Figueroa's work included participating in Thor Heyerdahl's Rapa Nui expedition, restoring Ahu Akivi moai with William Mulloy, and working generally for over four decades to conserve and, in some cases, restore the archaeological monuments of Rapa Nui for future generations.

== 1955–1956 Rapa Nui Expedition ==
Thor Heyerdahl long asserted that Polynesia had been colonized not from Southeast Asia, as was (and still is) widely accepted, but from South America. In 1947, Heyerdahl successfully sailed the balsa-wood raft Kon-Tiki from Peru to the Tuamotu Islands in an effort to prove it could be done. The subsequent Rapa Nui expedition was meant to be less of an adventurous experiment and more of a true scientific expedition.

Figueroa was a 24-year-old graduate student in archaeology at the University of Chile and working at Santiago's natural history museum when he joined Heyerdahl's expedition as the official representative of Chile and liaison officer, or, as Edwin Ferndon referred to him, "a 'watchdog' representative." He was also to assist the team's four professional archaeologists, Arne Skjolsvold, William Mulloy, Ferndon, and Carlyle Smith. Heyerdahl described Figueroa as "an athletic aristocrat with a chameleonic gift of adapting himself naturally to the most variable conditions of life." Ferndon also praised Figueroa and his contribution to the expedition, saying "Gonzalo had proved to be thoughtful and understanding in his position as Chilean representative and had become so completely a part of the working team that we saw him only as another hard working, cooperative scientist."

Being a Chilean and a native Spanish speaker, one of Figueroa's contributions was to smooth interactions with the islanders, but he was not always successful. Heyerdahl recounted how the captain of the expedition's ship wanted visiting aboriginal islanders to sign the ship's guestbook, but all of them refused. Figueroa attempted to get the crowd to comply, "[b]ut when he tried to give further explanations there was more and more disturbance around him ... [Heyerdahl] had to use all of [his] authority to get Gonzalo out of the crowd, and he came back with the book, untidy and dishevelled." The islanders had refused to sign because they believed that was how their ancestors had been tricked into being taken to Peru as slaves.

Figueroa worked closely with each of the more senior archaeologists, including climbing the 900-foot (270-metre) volcano Rano Kau with Ferndon, supporting Heyerdahl during negotiations in which Chilean authorities threatened to confiscate all of the expedition's archaeological materials, excavating reed huts with Smith, and conducting excavations on the islands of Hivaoa and Raivavae with Skjolsvold. On Raivavae, Gonzalo and Skjolsvold performed a prodigious amount of archaeological work in a relatively short time. Ferndon recounted how a "grim and bearded Gonzalo" showed the other team members "beautifully excavated" terraces "standing clean and neat as if recently swept and dusted", and Figueroa's and Skjolsvold's "work output was certainly in excess of what one would normally expect."

Figueroa did not agree with Heyderdahl's theory that Polynesia was colonized by South Americans sailing balsa rafts, and strongly disliked aspects of Heyderdahl's behavior during the expedition. Nevertheless, he remained Heyerdahl's friend and refused to speak publicly about their differences, even after Heyerdahl's death in 2002.

One result of the expedition was the first re-erection of a moai on its ahu platform. Another result was international attention that began the process of turning Rapa Nui into a tourist attraction.

== 1960–1970 conservation and restoration efforts on Rapa Nui ==
In 1960, Figueroa returned to Rapa Nui with William Mulloy. For an entire year the two archaeologists investigated and recommended sites for possible restoration. Many moai had been pulled down during warfare between rival island clans, and erosion, resource-scavenging by natives, souvenir-taking by tourists, and encroachment by public works were destroying what remained. During this time, Figueroa and Mulloy restored Ahu Akivi, which had been "a disordered group of fallen statues and fragments, but with restoration it became an impressive platform ..." They re-erected a total of seven moai on Ahu Akivi, including replacing broken heads onto four of them. Each statue was over 4 meters (13 feet) in height and approximately 15,000 kilograms (33,000 pounds) in weight, and was raised by gradually levering it into an upright position, just as the prehistoric islanders had done. Figueroa and Mulloy considered this "a pilot project to demonstrate that ahu restoration could be done at reasonable cost and that it should be an important part of a future program of conservation of monuments."

Chile soon requested that UNESCO commission a study of the island's archaeological monuments and create a program to restore them. Figueroa and Mulloy were commissioned to perform the study. Although they each had and relied heavily on approximately two years of previous archaeological investigation and restoration experience on the island, Figueroa and Mulloy spent fifteen days on the island in March and April 1966 gathering additional data for the report. The team also included Charles E. Peterson, an architectural historian, restorationist, and planner, and Raul Bulnes, an architect from the Chilean Ministry of Public Works. The team was based in the town of Hanga Roa, and made daily trips by jeep and horseback to various locations. In late 1966, Figueroa and Mulloy co-authored the resulting comprehensive UNESCO report "as part of a wider investigation leading to a general development plan for the island of Rapa Nui." The report noted that "because of [Figueroa's] extensive experience in archaeological investigation on the island, [he] possessed unique knowledge of the problems and archaeological monuments involved."

Figueroa and Mulloy asserted that "[b]ecause of the remarkable number, size, and variety of the archaeological monuments on Rapa Nui, there is no other island in the Pacific remotely approaching it in adaptability to be developed into an island-wide museum of Polynesian prehistory. This could be accomplished by a relatively modest long term project of archaeological conservation and restoration ... [S]uch an island-wide museum ... would quickly become world famous ...".

Their recommendations included conducting a complete archaeological inventory of the island, recording place names, and conserving the many different types of archaeological monuments (e.g., moai, ahu, enclosures, caves, towers, cairns, roads, petroglyphs, villages, and quarries) "with the most serious and systematic attention." However, they also "recommended most emphatically that all monuments should not be restored ... to illustrate the effects of prehistoric demolition" and to allow future archaeologists to investigate the monuments using improved techniques.

In 1967, the Easter Island Committee was established to implement Figueroa's and Mulloy's plan as set forth in their UNESCO report.

Between 1968 and 1970, Figueroa and Mulloy personally restored several more moai at the Tahani complex.

== Later years ==
In the 1980s, Figueroa returned to Rapa Nui with Skjolsvold to examine the kneeling moai, Tukuturi, and to excavate what was believed to be the location where Polynesians first arrived on the island.

In the early 1990s, Figueroa was involved in a disagreement about efforts to restore the Tongariki site on Rapa Nui. Tongariki was once the largest religious site in Polynesia, with a very large ahu supporting fifteen moai. Warring islanders toppled and damaged many of the moai, and a tsunami in 1960 caused further damage and scattered them up to 300 feet (91 meters) from their original positions. Figueroa said, "Tongariki is the most important monument in Polynesia. The restoration will not only dignify the Easter Island [sic] but all of Polynesia. This belongs to the patrimony of humanity. We should excavate and restore at the highest technical level possible." However, a dispute arose as to who should manage the restoration project. Figueroa argued that the chief supervisor should be American archaeologist William S. Ayres of the University of Oregon. Ayres was an authority on and had written extensively about Rapa Nui and Polynesia, and Figueroa believed Ayres would ensure that all findings would be made available to the public. The University of Chile opposed having an American lead the restoration, and named Claudio Cristino, the director of the Easter Island Museum, as the chief supervisor. Cristino had more experience on Rapa Nui than any other archaeologist, knew the local language, and had conducted extensive surveys on the island. Figueroa also argued that the restoration team should include a larger number of trained archaeologists, but the University of Chile sent graduate students to assist Cristino. It is worth noting, however, that Cristino agreed with Figueroa's and Mulloy's 1966 recommendation that not all sites should be restored: "We don't need massive restoration of statues. If I restore a site, I am destroying 1,000 years of history" by recreating a specific moment that ignores everything that subsequently occurred.

Over the years, Figueroa continued to advise the Chilean government and UNESCO on the conservation and restoration of archaeological sites. In 2003, the Chilean government awarded him the national Conservation of Monuments prize.

== Personal life ==
Figueroa was married twice. His first wife, Christiane Cassel, predeceased him. His second wife, Maria Angelica Schade, from whom he was separated, survived him. He had two sons and a daughter with Schade, and a daughter with an earlier partner on Rapa Nui.

Figueroa became ill in 2007 and died in 2008.

== Selected publications ==
- Figueroa, G., and Mulloy, W. (1960). "Medidas a fin de salvar el tesoro arqueológico de Isla de Pascua". Boletín de la Universidad de Chile 14: 2-16.
- Medina, A., Reyes, F., and Figueroa, G. (1958). "Expedición al Cerro El Plomo". Arqueología Chilena. [No further citation information available].
- Mulloy, W., and Figueroa, G. (1962). "Como fue restaurado el Ahu Akivi en la Isla de Pascua". Boletín de la Universidad de Chile 27: 4-11.
- Mulloy W., and Figueroa, G. (1963). "Excavacion de una cueva en las proximidades de Ahu Akivi". Antropologia, Universidad de Chile 1(1): 34-43.
- Mulloy, W. T., and Figueroa, G.-H. (1966). Chile and the archaeological heritage of Easter Island: A report prepared for the United Nations Educational, Scientific, and Cultural Organization. Paris: UNESCO.
- Mulloy, W. T., and Figueroa, G. (1978). The A Kivi-Vai Teka complex and its relationship to Easter Island architectural prehistory. Honolulu: Social Science Research Institute, University of Hawaii at Manoa.
- Mulloy, W., Figueroa, G., Boutilier, J. A., Hughes, D. T., and Tiffany, S. W. (eds.). (1979). Mission, church and sect in Oceania. ASAO Monographs No. 6. Ann Arbor, University. The Journal of the Polynesian Society.
