= Tahai =

Archaeological site on Easter Island

Coordinates: 27.1402°S 109.4271°W

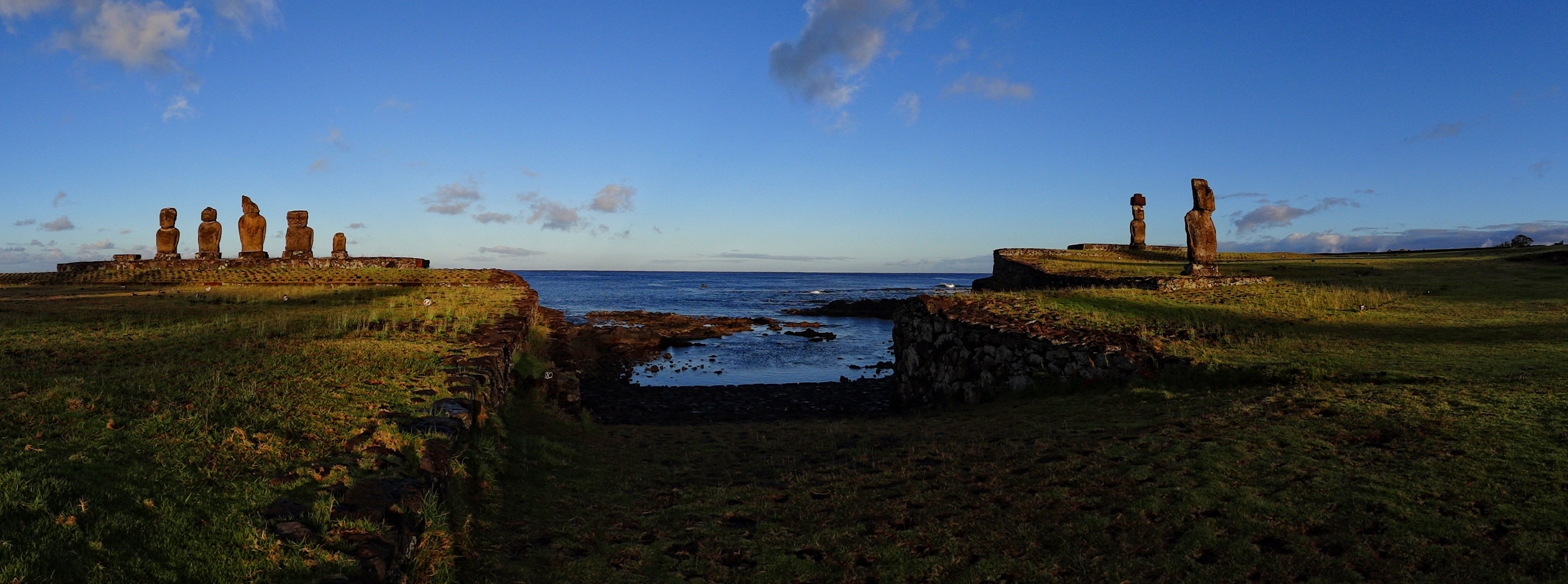
The complex seen from the east at sunrise

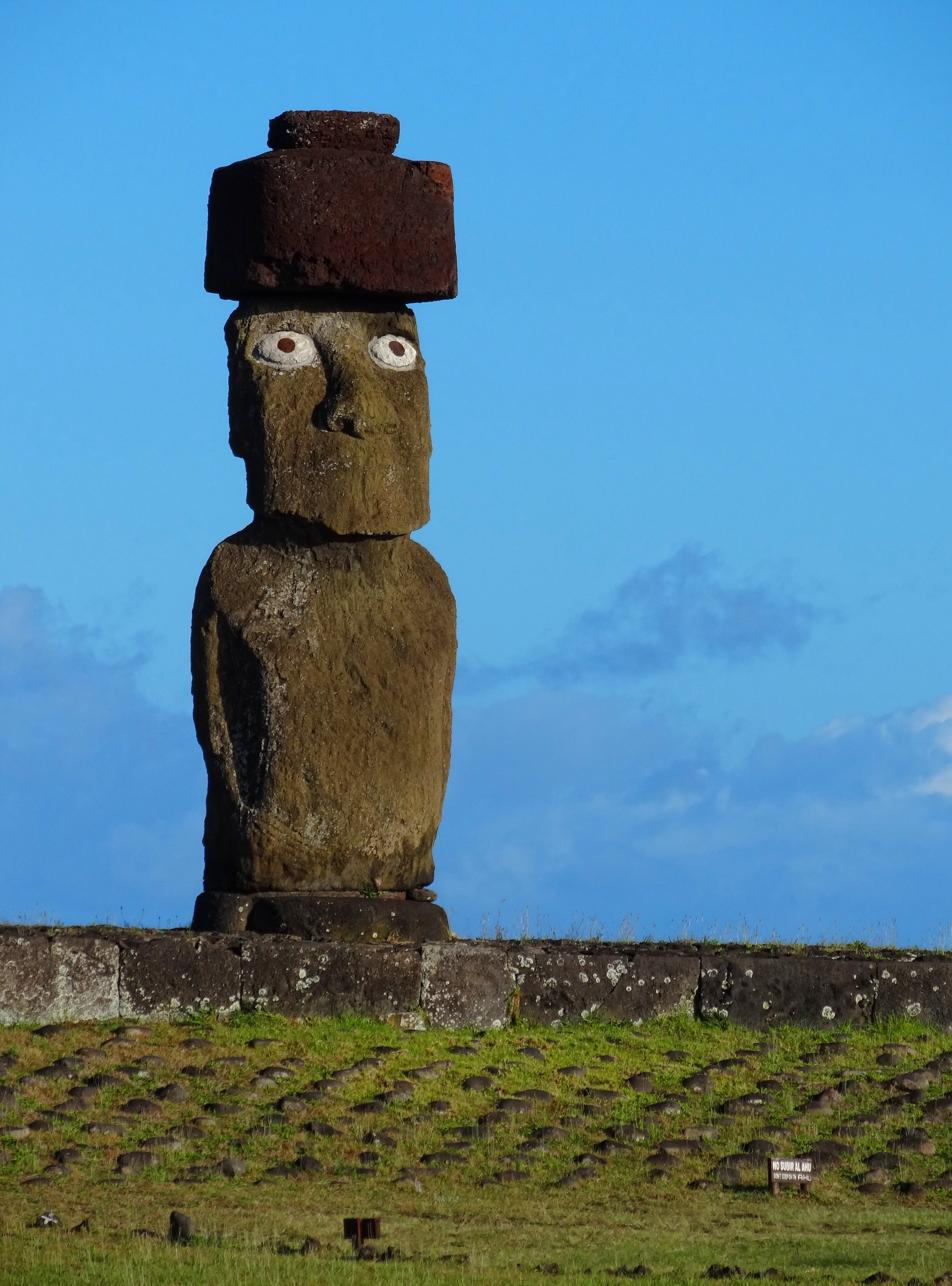
Ahu Ko Te Riku, with the restored eyes

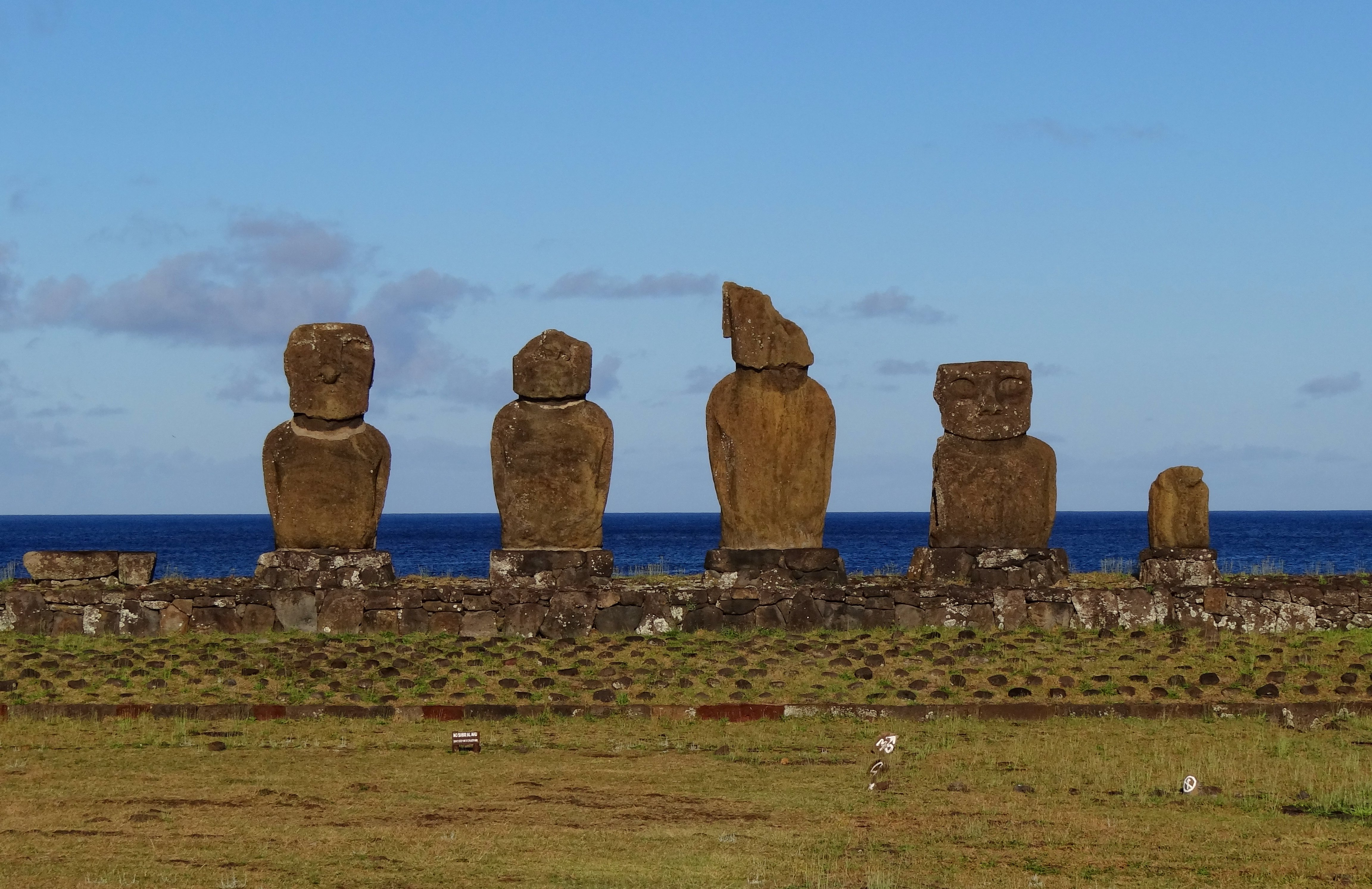
Ahu Vai Ure

The Tahai Ceremonial Complex is an archaeological site on Rapa Nui (Easter Island) in Chilean Polynesia. Restored in 1974 by American archaeologist William Mulloy, Tahai comprises three principal ahu from north to south: Ko Te Riku (with restored eyes), Tahai, and Vai Ure. Visible in the distance from Tahai are two restored ahu at Hanga Kio'e, projects that Mulloy undertook in 1972. Like other Mulloy restoration projects at Ahu Akivi, the ceremonial village of Orongo and Vinapu, the ceremonial center at Tahai now constitutes an integral part of the Rapa Nui National Park, designated by UNESCO as a World Heritage site.

William Mulloy and his wife Emily Ross Mulloy are buried at Tahai.
