= George Carr Frison =

American archaeologist (1924–2020)

- Born: November 11, 1924; Worland, Wyoming, U.S.
- Died: September 6, 2020 (aged 95)
- Education: University of Wyoming (BS); University of Michigan
- Occupation: Archaeologist
- Spouse: June Granville
- Children: 1 adopted
- Scientific career
- Fields: Archaeology

George Carr Frison (November 11, 1924 – September 6, 2020) was an American archaeologist. He received the Society for American Archaeology's Lifetime Achievement Award, the Paleoarchaeologist of the Century Award, and was elected to the National Academy of Sciences. He was Wyoming's first State Archaeologist, and was a founder of the University of Wyoming Anthropology Department. He died in September 2020 at the age of 95.

== Early life ==
Frison's grandparents, Jake and Margaret Frison, homesteaded to Leadville, Colorado in 1890 with the dream of starting a cattle ranch. Unsatisfied by the limitations of their ranch property, they decided to try their ranching luck in the town of Ten Sleep in Northern Wyoming in 1901. By the 1920s, the ranch was a viable cattle operation with the three sons of Jake and Margaret obtaining their own homesteads of 640 acres (2.6 km^{2}) each.

George Frison was born in Worland, Wyoming on November 11, 1924 (Thomson Gale 2007). Frison's father was killed in an accident in 1924 before George Frison was born. Frison's mother left when George was three, and his paternal grandparents in Wyoming raised him. Frison took to ranching as a young man and helped his grandparents run the family ranch.

Frison was intrigued by fossil dinosaur and mammoth bones he found as a youngster in Wyoming, along with a variety of archaeological features such as chipped and ground stone tools, rock shelters, rock art, and scaffold burials (Vittitow 2006). Many researchers, such as geologist Harold Cook, paleontologist Glenn Jepsen, and anthropologist Waldo Wedel were investigating the areas near the Frison ranch for various research projects. Frison was intrigued by Paleontologist Barnum Brown, of the American Museum of Natural History, who excavated dinosaur beds close to the Frison ranch in 1934. Frison brought several cigar boxes of fossils to him to identify. Barnum was the researcher who identified the bison bones at the Folsom site in New Mexico, so he discussed the Folsom complex with a young George Frison, who had never heard of Folsom before. These experiences were helping to shape Frison's interest in and knowledge of both fossils and ancient American cultures (Vittitow 2006).

George Frison was an accomplished hunter and learned about hunting and animal behavior from his grandfather. Through experience and family ethics, Frison as a hunter was able to adopt a philosophy of conservation that worked for both the hunter and the hunted, and the common environment that both had to live in. Frison later believed that his philosophy must also have been the philosophy of early hunters.

When he was 11 years old he had his first, and most unforgettable, incident with a bison bull in a state park near Thermopolis, about 50 miles (80 km) from his home ranch, when ten loose bison wandered from the park, and Frison was able to secure permission to assist local cowhands to escort the bison back to the park. A young bison bull that created too much confusion among the other bison was left behind. Frison found the bison bull grazing a few days later and decided to outrun the bull on horseback. After both Frison and the bison cleared two fences, the bull stopped at the third fence, turned 180 degrees and decided to charge. Frison soon learned how an awkward and docile bison could soon be a danger, as both Frison and his horse toppled to the ground when the bull passed between the horse's legs. However, all three managed to sustain no injury (Frison 2004).

After graduation from high school in 1942, Frison enrolled in the University of Wyoming. His education was cut short when World War II began and he decided to enlist in the United States Navy. He served in the amphibious forces of the South Pacific during World War II, and received an honorable discharge in 1946 to return to Ten Sleep to work on the family ranch. He felt with the thought that the ranch "was the only place on earth…I really wanted to get back to it and it needed somebody to really do some work on the place and hold it together. At that point, I didn't have any great desire to go back to school (Vittitow 2006)." At this time he also began work as a hunting guide, and married June Granville (Vittitow 2006).

Frison joined the Wyoming Archaeological Society and spent over 20 years working as an avocational archaeologist. In 1952 George discovered a hidden cave full of atlatl and dart fragments, which were used by ancient American hunters as spear throwers, and took them to local archaeologist Dr. William Mulloy. George learned how to make the darts and atlatls himself and later, in 1965, described and published work on the cave now known as Springer Creek.

In 1956, George and June Frison adopted a daughter, Carol Frison Placek, who was born in 1952 (Beaver 2006). George continued to work as an avocational archaeologist until 1962 when the Frison family ranch and hunting and guiding business ended (Frison 2004).

While attending a meeting of the American Association for the Advancement of Science in Denver in 1961, Frison learned that in order to succeed with an academic career in archaeology, he must have a formal university education. Frison sought advice from Professor William Mulloy at the University of Wyoming regarding future research and educational possibilities, and in 1962 he decided to enroll at the University of Wyoming, at age 37, to finish his undergraduate work (Frison 2004).

== Education ==
In 1964 George Frison received a Bachelor of Science degree with honors in anthropology from the University of Wyoming (Vittitow 2006). Frison proceeded to graduate school at the University of Michigan with a fellowship from the Woodrow Wilson National Fellowship Foundation, under James B. Griffin and Arthur Jelinek (Beaver 2006). Frison soon learned that the current literature on human hunters and hunting lacked credibility, and rarely took into account the hunted animal's behavior, and often portrayed the hunter using unrealistic and illogical forms of hunting methodology (Frison 2004).

In 1965 George Frison received a Master's degree in anthropology from the University of Michigan, and was accepted into the University's PhD program. In 1967, he received his Doctorate degree in anthropology from the University of Michigan.

== Timeline of accomplishments ==
- 1967: Frison was appointed head of the newly formed Anthropology Department at the University of Wyoming. He builds the University of Wyoming's Anthropology Department from a two faculty member undergraduate program in 1968 to a highly regarded PhD program (Vittitow 2006).
- 1968: Appointed the first Wyoming State Archaeologist (Beaver 2006).
- 1972: Frison was elected President of the board of the Plains Anthropological Society for one year (Beaver 2006).
- 1995: Retires from the University of Wyoming Anthropology Department (Beaver 2006).
- 1997: Elected to the National Academy of Sciences, while the University of Wyoming's Board of Trustees established the George C. Frison Institute of Archaeology and Anthropology, a research facility dedicated to the study of North American, High Plains, and Rocky Mountain archaeology (Vittitow 2006).
- 1999: Received the Paleoarchaeologist of the Century award at the "Clovis and Beyond" conference (Beaver 2006).
- 2005: Frison was awarded the Society for American Archaeology Lifetime Achievement Award (Vittitow 2006).
- 2007: Frison served as Professor Emeritus of Anthropology at the University of Wyoming.

== Theory and practice ==
George Frison's main focus of research had been the Paleoindian mammoth hunters of prehistoric North America beginning over 11,500 years ago (Vittitow 2006). He had studied mammoth hunting culture, mainly from the tools and bones left behind, across the Great Plains, the Rocky Mountains, Africa, and the former Soviet Union.

In 1976, Frison's research on chipped-stone tools gave rise to the expression "the Frison Effect", which described how sharpening the edges of stone tools changes their shape and their use. The end product may look nothing like the original tool. This has often led to debate because archaeologists rely on tool shapes to understand different cultures (Vittitow 2006).

Frison traveled to Africa in the 1980s to observe African elephants in their natural habitats and to gain information for proposing strategies of procurement for African elephants, that could be applied to mammoth hunters. Frison became aware that prehistoric hunters had to become experts in mammoth behavior in order to survive (Vittitow 2006). Frison strongly advocated realistic experimentation with ancient tools, so he experimented in Zimbabwe, with modern-made Clovis points on dead and dying elephants, that were culled to get rid of excess numbers. He found that the Clovis tools were not only adequate, but very successful in penetrating the hide and ribcage of an African elephant, and quite possibly a mammoth as well. He published the results in 1989. Frison also traveled to the former Soviet Union in 1989, after the Cold War had ended, for research on mammoths, and mammoth sites (Vittitow 2006).

It has been a popular notion that early American hunters killed off the large game, such as mammoths, that inhabited North America in the Late Pleistocene (Alroy 2001, Grayson 1977). However, Frison saw tribal cultures as having numerous rituals and restrictions against excess hunting and excess production. Frison hypothesized that there would be no incentive to kill more animals that one would need, and that the real cause of the late Pleistocene megafaunal mass extinction was climate, not humans (Vittitow 2006).

Frison believed that the earliest New World human group that was making stone weaponry capable of killing mammoths, and successful mammoth procurement, was the Clovis culture, and that no earlier cultural group in North America possessed the tools needed to produce lethal wounds on mammoths, extinct species of bison, and other large animals, or to create a viable subsistence strategy based on large animal hunting and procurement.

Frison also believed that the modern counterparts of extinct North American species such as horses, elephants, and camels, are potential and plausible subjects of study and speculation for scientists, and that studies such as the Zimbabwe Clovis experiment on elephants should continue, being necessary part of gaining understanding of behavioral patterns, as well as procurement strategies of past cultures (Frison 2004).

== Selected works ==
- Frison, George C. 1962. Wedding of the Waters Cave, 48HO301, A Stratified Site in the Big Horn Basin of Northern Wyoming. Plains Anthropologist 7(18):246-265.
- Frison, George C. 1965. Spring Creek Cave, Wyoming. American Antiquity 31(1):81-94.
- Frison, George C. 1968. Leigh Cave, Wyoming, Site 48WA304. The Wyoming Archaeologist 11(3):20-33.
- Frison, George C. 1971. The Buffalo Pound in North-Western Plains Prehistory: Site 48CA302, Wyoming. American Antiquity 36:77-91.
- Frison, George C. 1973. Early Period Marginal Cultural Groups in Northern Wyoming. Plains Anthropologist 18(62):300-312.
- Frison, George C. 1976. The Chronology of Paleo-Indian and Altithermal Period Groups in the Bighorn Basin, Wyoming. In Cultural Change and Continuity: Essays in Honor of James Bennett Griffin, edited by C. E. Cleland, pp. 147–173. Academic Press, New York.
- Frison, George C. 1978. Prehistoric Hunters of the High Plains. Academic Press, New York.
- Frison, George C. 1979. Observations on the use of tools: dulling of working edges on some chipped stone tools in bison butchering. In Lithic use-wear analysis, edited by B. Hayden, pp. 259–269. Academic Press, New York.
- Frison, G. C., and D. C. Grey. 1980. Pryor Stemmed, a Specialized Paleo-Indian Ecological Adaptation. Plains Anthropologist 25(87):27–46.
- Frison, George C. and Dennis J. Stanford, editors. 1982. The Agate Basin Site. Academic Press, New York.
- Frison, G. C., R. L. Andrews, J. M. Adovasio, R. C. Carlisle, and R. Edgar. 1986. A Late Paleoindian Animal Trapping Net from Northern Wyoming. American Antiquity 51(1):352-361.
- Frison, George C. and Lawrence C. Todd. 1987. The Horner Site: The Type Site of the Cody Cultural Complex. Academic Press, New York.
- Frison, George C. 1988. Paleoindian Subsistence and Settlement During Post-Clovis Times on the Northwestern Plains, the Adjacent Mountain Ranges, and Intermontane Basins. In America Before Columbus: Ice-Age Origins, edited by. R. C. Carlisle. Ethnology Monographs no. 12., University of Pittsburgh Department of Anthropology.
- Frison, George C. 1989. Experimental Use of Clovis Weaponry and Tools on African Elephants. American Antiquity 54(4):766-784.
- Frison, George C. 1991. Prehistoric Hunters of the High Plains (Second Edition). Academic Press, San Diego.
- Frison, George C. 1992. The Foothills-Mountains and the Open Plains: The Dichotomy in Paleoindian Subsistence Strategies Between Two Ecosystems. In Ice Age Hunters of the Rockies, edited by D. J. Stanford and J. S. Day, pp 323–342. Denver Museum of Natural History and University Press of Colorado, Niwot.
- Frison, George C. 1996. The Mill Iron Site. University of New Mexico Press, Albuquerque.
- Frison, George C. 1998. Paleoindian Large Mammal Hunters on the Plains of North America. Proceedings of the National Academy of Sciences 95:14576- 14583.
