= Biblioteca William Mulloy =

Research library in Rapa Nui

William Mulloy Library
- Biblioteca William Mulloy
- 27°8′14.34″S 109°25′26.03″W
- Location: Ahu Tahai, Easter Island, Chile
- Type: Research library
- Scope: Cultural patrimony of the Rapa Nui people
- Established: 2002

Collection
- Items collected: Books, articles, reprints, field notes, maps, photographs and slides

The Biblioteca William Mulloy (Spanish for William Mulloy Library; in Rapa Nui, Hare Puka ko Wiliam Mulloy) is a research library administered by the Father Sebastian Englert Anthropological Museum on Rapa Nui (Easter Island) in Chilean Polynesia. Named for the late Dr. William Mulloy, an American archaeologist, the library’s collection focuses on Rapa Nui and Polynesian Studies, especially the prehistory, history, ethnology, archaeology, cultural anthropology, osteology and geology of Easter Island.

== Mission ==
William Mulloy typing field notes on board the Christian Bjelland during the Norwegian Archaeological Expedition to Rapa Nui in 1955

The mission of the Biblioteca William Mulloy is threefold. Firstly, the Library seeks to support the field work of archaeologists, anthropologists, linguists, ethnologists and other scholars who come to Easter Island for research purposes. Secondly, the Library promotes the conservation and study of the cultural patrimony of the Rapa Nui people. Finally, the Library provides broad access within the island community to the best scholarly resources in Rapa Nui and Polynesian Studies.

== Mulloy Collection ==
The collection of the Biblioteca William Mulloy includes books, journals, articles, archival materials, field notes, maps, photographs and audiovisual materials related to Rapa Nui. Dr. William Mulloy’s personal library forms the core of the collection. The Father Sebastian Englert Anthropological Museum, the Chilean Directorate of Libraries, Archives and Museums (DiBAM), the Easter Island Foundation and the Mulloy family have contributed to the original collection, more than doubling it in a short period of time. The library, located on the campus of the museum in the Tahai district of the island, has climate-controlled stacks and a 72-square-meter (780 sq ft) lecture hall, which accommodates approximately thirty persons.

== Background ==
Shortly before his death in 1978, the renowned archaeologist, William Mulloy, expressed the desire that his personal library, consisting of books, articles, reprints, field notes, maps, photographs and slides, find a permanent home on Rapa Nui in order to be of service to both specialized researchers coming to the island from abroad and to the general public.

After his death, his widow, Emily Ross Mulloy, consigned the collection to Mario Correa, Cultural Attaché of the Consulate General of Chile in Washington DC, who with the aid of Marilyn Pugh of LanChile, transferred the library to mainland Chile. At the time, lack of satisfactory facilities on Rapa Nui did not favor the immediate transfer of library or archival materials. Instead, the collection was entrusted to the Easter Island Foundation. The Foundation maintained the library at the Fonck Museum in Viña del Mar, hired a Rapa Nui librarian and placed the collection at the disposal of the public. In addition to its long-term financial support of the library, the Easter Island Foundation assisted with the relocation of Mulloy Library materials to the island when a suitable space was made ready on Museum premises.

After its transfer from Viña del Mar, the Biblioteca William Mulloy opened on Rapa Nui in 2002 and was dedicated by Dr. Mulloy’s widow, Emily Ross Mulloy, Clara Budnik (Director of the DiBAM), and prominent members of the Rapa Nui community.
