= Juan Edmunds Rapahango =

Mayor of Hanga Roa
- In office 1973–1979; 1990–1992

Personal details
- Born: 1923
- Died: August 20, 2012 (aged 88–89)
- Relations: Pedro Pablo Edmunds Paoa (son)

Juan Edmunds Rapahango (1923 – August 20, 2012) was a Rapa Nui politician, the former Mayor of Hanga Roa, the municipality of Rapa Nui (Easter Island), in Chilean Polynesia. He is the son of Henry Percy Edmunds, director of the Williamson-Balfour Company, and Victoria Rapahango, an important native respondent for early ethnologists visiting the island. He is the father of the former mayor Pedro Pablo Edmunds Paoa. As mayor, Edmunds Rapahango promoted tourism to the island and helped to develop the island's infrastructure. He collaborated closely with William Mulloy and supported the American archaeologist's restoration projects. Edmunds Rapahango saw that Rapa Nui archaeology would play an important role the future of the island's economy.
