= William Mulloy =

American anthropologist

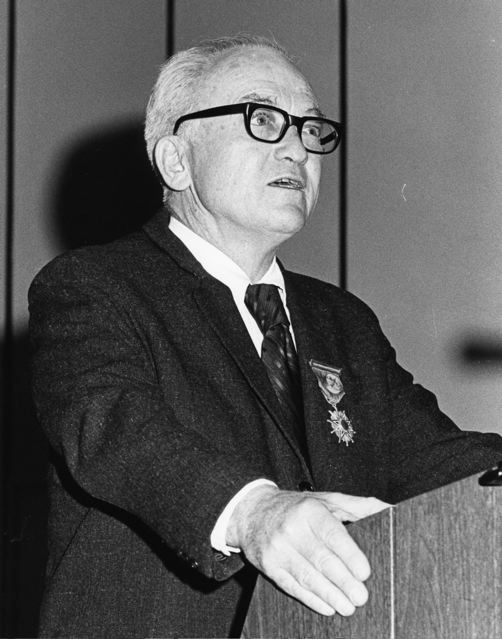
- Mulloy lecturing on Rapa Nui archaeology in 1975, on the occasion of receiving the O'Higgins Award, Chile's highest civilian honor.
- Born: William Thomas Mulloy Jr. May 3, 1917; Salt Lake City, Utah, U.S.
- Died: March 25, 1978 (aged 60); Laramie, Wyoming, U.S.
- Resting place: Tahai, Easter Island
- Occupation: Anthropologist
- Years active: 1930s–1978
- Known for: Investigations into the production, transportation and erection of the moai on Easter Island

William Thomas Mulloy Jr. (May 3, 1917 – March 25, 1978) was an American anthropologist. While his early research established him as a formidable scholar and skillful fieldwork supervisor in the province of North American Plains archaeology, he is best known for his studies of Polynesian prehistory, especially his investigations into the production, transportation and erection of the monumental statuary on Rapa Nui (Easter Island) known as moai.

== Early life and education ==
Mulloy was born May 3, 1917, in Salt Lake City, Utah, the only son of William Thomas Mulloy Sr., a conductor on the Union Pacific Railroad, and Barbara Seinsoth Mulloy. His older sister, Mary Grace Mulloy Strauch, recognized and encouraged his early interest in archaeology. On the occasions of his childhood visits to her home in Mesa, Arizona, she would drive him to the town dump where he spent days at a time conducting his own stratification studies and enthusiastically reporting his results to her family at suppertime.

Mulloy earned a BA in anthropology from the University of Utah, where he had distinguished himself both in the classroom and on the wrestling team. From 1938 to 1939, he worked for the Louisiana State Archaeological Survey as a field archaeologist. In the Louisiana bayou, he contracted malaria. From Louisiana, Mulloy went to Illinois where he began graduate studies at the University of Chicago, then one of the world's foremost graduate schools of Anthropology and Archaeology. In the summer of 1940, Mulloy supervised archaeological fieldwork at Pueblo Bonito in Chaco Canyon, New Mexico. There, among the field crew, he met his future wife, Emily Ross, an archaeology major at the University of New Mexico.

His graduate studies were interrupted when, shortly after the Attack on Pearl Harbor, Mulloy enlisted in the US Army. At Camp Roberts, California, he served first in the Field Artillery Instrument and Survey School. Recognizing his talent and intelligence, the Army sent him to Officer Candidate School in North Dakota. In 1943, Mulloy received his commission in the Counter Intelligence Corps. An outstanding linguist, Mulloy first learned Japanese and then became a Japanese language instructor in order to prepare US military officers for the invasion and occupation of Japan. As a reserve officer, Mulloy advanced to the rank of major.

After World War II ended, Mulloy returned to graduate studies in Chicago with his wife, Emily, and their infant daughter Kathy, who was born in 1945. As a graduate student, he worked in the steel mills, in the railroad yards and as janitor in an apartment building in South Chicago. After earning an MA from the University of Chicago in 1948, Mulloy accepted a teaching position in what was then the Department of Anthropology, Sociology and Economics at the University of Wyoming and moved his family to Laramie, where both his son, Patrick, and his second daughter, Brigid, were born.

Five years after joining the faculty in Wyoming, Mulloy returned to Chicago and successfully defended his doctoral dissertation, A Preliminary Historical Outline for the Northwest Plains, still a standard work in the field of North American Plains Indian society. The University of Chicago granted him a PhD in 1953.

== University of Wyoming ==
Even as a junior faculty member of the University of Wyoming, Mulloy distinguished himself as a teacher. George Carr Frison, once a professor of anthropology, recalled that when he came to UW in 1962 as a 37-year-old freshman, except for an occasional visiting lecturer, Mulloy taught all of the courses offered by the university in anthropology.

Mulloy receiving an honorary doctorate from the University of Wyoming in 1976.

Apart from Professor Frison, Mulloy's former students at the University of Wyoming include former US Senator from Wyoming, Alan K. Simpson; Charles Love, a geologist on the faculty of Western Wyoming College and a researcher in Rapa Nui Geology and Archaeology; Dr. Dennis J. Stanford, Chair of the Department of Anthropology of the National Museum of Natural History at the Smithsonian Institution in Washington DC; and Sergio Rapu Haoa, former director of the anthropological museum on Rapa Nui and the island's first native governor.

During his three-decade academic career in Laramie, Mulloy perennially received the recognition of his students and faculty colleagues. His engaging classroom presence brought him such honors as the Omicron Delta Kappa Award for outstanding teaching. The Wyoming Archaeological Society established the William Mulloy Scholarship in his honor in 1960. In 1964, he was the recipient of the George Duke Humphrey Distinguished Faculty Award. In 1976, the University of Wyoming awarded him its highest distinction, the LLD degree, honoris causa.

In 1968, Mulloy established the Wyoming Anthropological Museum and served as its curator until his death. His personal collection of modern Rapa Nui folk art now forms part of the University of Wyoming Art Museum.

== Plains archaeology ==
Mulloy undertook extensive research projects in North American Plains Indian and Southwestern Indian archaeology. He investigated sites in New Mexico, Wyoming, and Montana. His monographs on the Hagen Site in Glendive, Montana and the McKean site in Crook County, Wyoming are still widely consulted.

Early in his career, Mulloy analyzed and interpreted the data collected at a prehistoric campsite near Red Lodge, Montana by parties from the Montana Archaeological Survey during their field work in 1937 and 1938. He replaced H. Melville Sayre as the director of a WPA project at Pictograph Cave (Billings, Montana) from October, 1940, until February, 1942.

From 1951 through 1954, Mulloy supervised the investigation of an 8000-year-old bison kill site near Laramie. Named for James Allen of Cody, Wyoming, who brought the location to Mulloy's attention in 1949, the site yielded a class of long, parallel-sided, unstemmed, concave-based projectile points used by paleo-Indians to hunt Bison occidentalis during the Pleistocene era. Mulloy designated the extraordinarily skillful example of oblique parallel flaking an Allen point.

In 1955, Mulloy and Dr. H. Marie Wormington, then Director of the Colorado Museum of Natural History and long acknowledged doyenne of North American Plains Archaeology, served as co-directors of archaeological survey work in Alberta, Canada conducted under the auspices of the Glenbow Museum Foundation.

== Rapa Nui archaeology ==
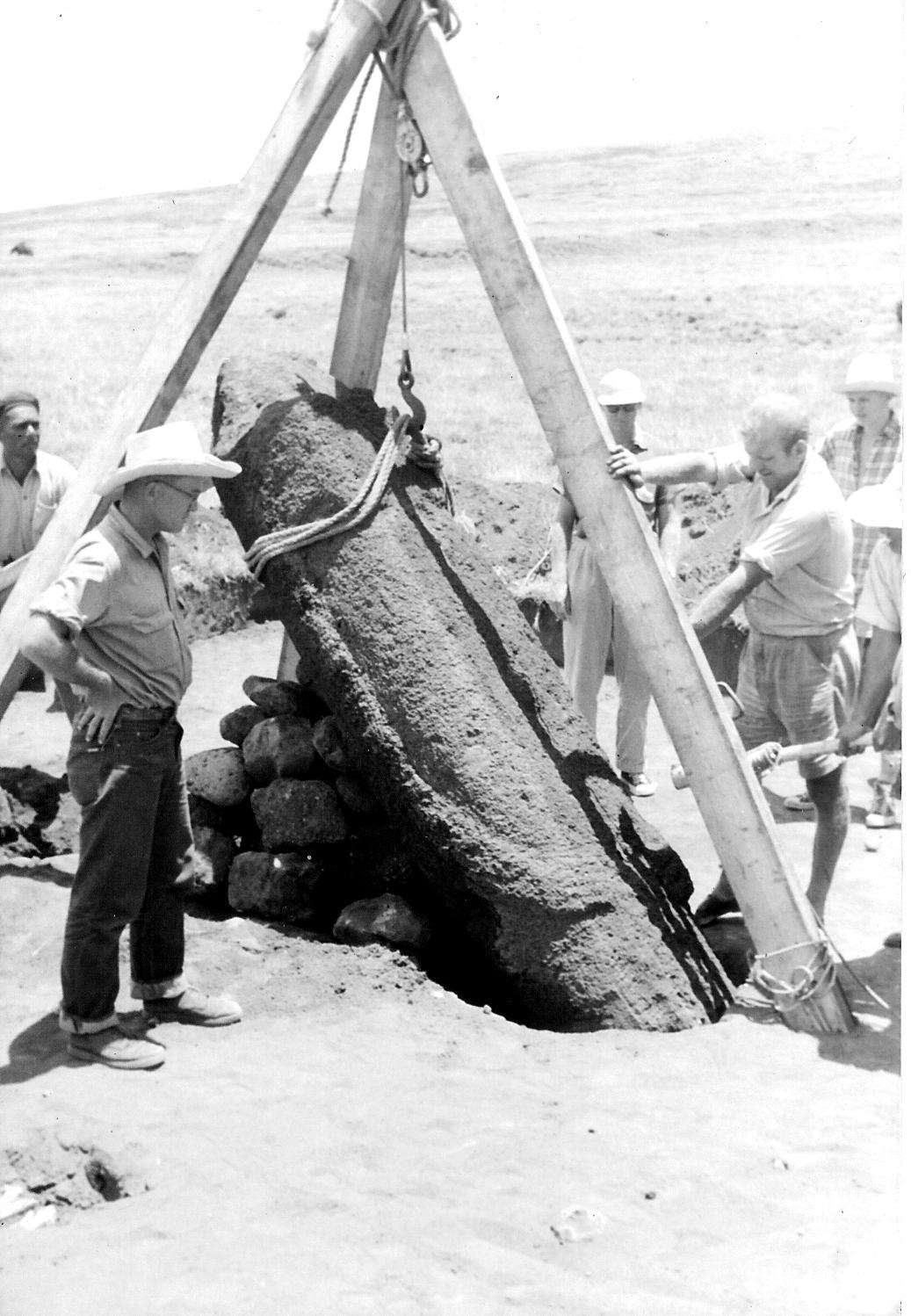
Bill Mulloy and Arne Skjølsvold at Vinapu on Rapa Nui during the Norwegian Archaeological Expedition of 1955.

In 1955, following his famous Kon-Tiki Expedition (1947), the Norwegian explorer Thor Heyerdahl assembled a team of specialists to conduct archaeological research at various sites throughout Eastern Polynesia. Acting on the recommendation of Dr. H. Marie Wormington, Heyerdahl invited Mulloy to participate in the Norwegian Archaeological Expedition (1955–56). In Panama, Mulloy joined Arne Skjølsvold, of the University of Oslo, Carlyle S. Smith, of the University of Kansas, Edwin N. Ferdon Jr., of the Arizona State Museum at the University of Arizona, and Gonzalo Figueroa García-Huidobro of the University of Chile aboard the Christian Bjelland, a chartered Norwegian ship. Apart from Rapa Nui, the team of archaeologists visited Rapa Iti, Tubuai, and Ra'ivavae in the Austral Islands, as well as Hiva 'Oa and Nuku Hiva in the Marquesas Islands during their ten-month tour. Together with his colleagues, Mulloy began preliminary investigations of the little-known archaeological sites of Rapa Nui. The international research staff that Heyerdahl brought together subsequently published the results of their investigations in Volume I of Archaeology of Easter Island (1961).

Shortly after his initial survey of Rapa Nui, Mulloy recognized the tremendously rich archaeological character of the island, its significance for understanding Oceanic prehistory and its potential to become an outstanding open-air museum of Polynesian culture. From 1955 to his untimely death in 1978, Mulloy would make more than twenty trips to Rapa Nui.

Upon his arrival on Rapa Nui in 1955, Mulloy met Father Sebastian Englert, OFM Cap., a Roman Catholic priest from Bavaria, for whose understanding of Rapa Nui culture and prehistory he developed the deepest respect. During the period of his missionary service on Rapa Nui, Father Sebastian compiled systematic field notes in the island's archaeology, ethnology and language, which he shared with Mulloy, who found them an important source of original research regarding all aspects of Rapa Nui culture. Mulloy later edited and translated a series of radio-broadcast lectures on Rapa Nui ethnology and prehistory that Padre Sebastián had originally prepared for Chilean naval personnel stationed in Antarctica. With Mulloy's support, the Englert lectures were published in the United States under the title Island at the Center of the World.

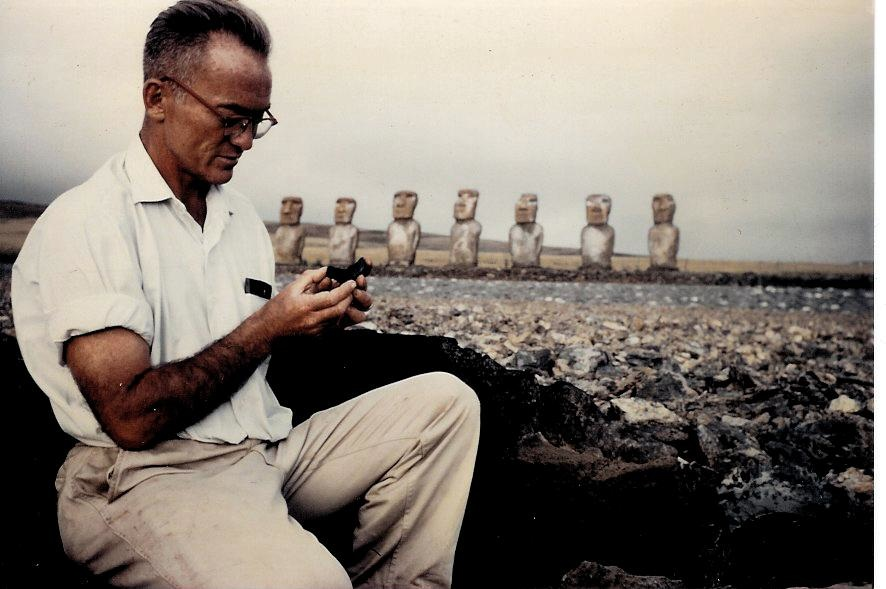
Bill Mulloy at Ahu Akivi, 1961.

Mulloy's Rapa Nui projects include the investigation of the Akivi-Vaiteka Complex and the physical restoration of Ahu Akivi (1960); the investigation and restoration of Ahu Ko Te Riku and Ahu Vai Uri and the Tahai Ceremonial Complex (1970); the investigation and restoration of two ahu at Hanga Kio'e (1972); the investigation and restoration of the ceremonial village at Orongo (1974) and numerous other archaeological surveys throughout the island. In particular, Mulloy's restoration projects on the island earned him the great respect of Rapa Nui islanders, many of whom collaborated with him at multiple venues. Among his chief collaborators were Juan Edmunds Rapahango, Martín Rapu Pua and Germán Hotu Teave, whose daughter, Melania Carolina Hotu Hey, is a former Provincial Governor of Rapa Nui.

In 1978, in recognition of his distinguished and unselfish work on behalf of the Rapa Nui community, Mulloy was named Illustrious Citizen of Easter Island, by then mayor Juan Edmunds Rapahango. Earlier that year, the Chilean government had bestowed upon him their highest civilian honor, the Orden de Don Bernardo O'Higgins.

== Legacy ==
Mulloy died of lung cancer in Laramie, Wyoming, on March 25, 1978. His remains were interred on Rapa Nui in full view of the Tahai Ceremonial Complex, one of his more important restoration projects. His widow, Emily Ross Mulloy, his son Patrick, his daughter Brigid and his grandson Phineas Kelly were present. Colleagues and friends joined the Rapa Nui community in paying their respects to the man whose work had brought their island to the attention of the world.

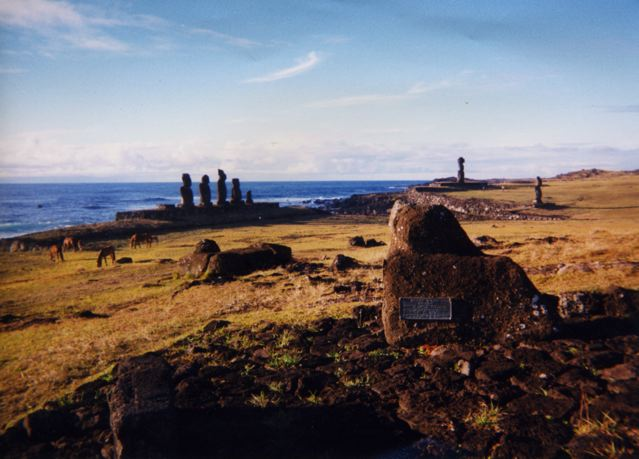
The Mulloy monument on Rapa Nui with the Tahai Ceremonial Complex in the background.

The Mulloy monument at Tahai bears inscriptions in three languages: Rapa Nui, English and Spanish. In Rapa Nui, the epitaph reads: Hai hāpī, hai haka tutu‘u i te ‘ariŋa ora, to‘ona here rahi mo Rapa Nui i haka tikea mai ai (By studying and raising up the living faces (moai), he showed us his great love for Rapa Nui). The commemoration in English states: "By restoring the past of his beloved island he also changed its future." Finally, the Spanish tribute says: Grande fue - como sus obras - su amor y entrega a Rapa Nui (As his works were great, so too was his love and sacrifice for Rapa Nui).

The Mulloy restoration projects at Ahu Akivi, the ceremonial village of Orongo, Vinapu, Ahu Ko Te Riku, Ahu Vai Ure and the rest of the ceremonial center at Tahai now constitute an integral part of the Rapa Nui National Park, designated by UNESCO as a World Heritage site.

Following his death, in May 1978, the Trustees of the University of Wyoming named him Distinguished Professor of Anthropology. In 1997, the Department of Anthropology at the University of Wyoming established the annual Mulloy Lecture Series in recognition of Mulloy's "four-field" approach, which integrated archaeology, biological anthropology, cultural anthropology and linguistic anthropology into a unified program at UW. In 2003, twenty-five years after his death, the College of Arts and Sciences at the University of Wyoming named him to their roster of Outstanding Former Faculty.

Bill and Emily Mulloy at Mataveri Airport on Rapa Nui.

Mulloy's Rapa Nui protégé, Sergio Rapu Haoa, completed a BA degree in anthropology at the University of Wyoming and went on to graduate studies at the University of Hawai'i. Upon his return to the Rapa Nui, Rapu directed the island's archaeology museum and conducted his own research and restoration projects, notably at Ahu Nau Nau in the Anakena district of the island. Rapu would later become the island's first Rapa Nui governor.

Mulloy's personal library forms the core of a research collection now located on Rapa Nui at the Father Sebastian Englert Anthropological Museum. For many years, the William Mulloy Library had been maintained in Viña del Mar, Chile by the Easter Island Foundation, who supported it, added to its collection and planned its eventual transfer to the island.

Emily Ross Mulloy, who died in 2003 at her home at 'Ualapu'e on Moloka'i in Hawai'i, is now buried with her husband at Tahai. The Mulloys have three children, Kathy, Patrick and Brigid; three grandchildren, Francisco Nahoe, Josefina Nahoe and Phineas Kelly; and three great-grandchildren, Rowan Kelly and Liam Kelly, and Mahine Edmunds Nahoe. Two of the Mulloy grandchildren, Francisco and Josefina, are ethnic Rapa Nui through their father, Guillermo Nahoe Pate.

== Selected bibliography ==
- Mulloy, W.T. 1943 A Prehistoric Campsite Near Red Lodge, Montana. American Antiquity 9:170-179.
- Mulloy, W.T. 1953. A Preliminary Historical Outline for the Northwestern Plains. Chicago: Ill. University of Chicago.
- Mulloy, W.T. 1954. The Ash Coulee Site. American Antiquity 25:112-116.
- Mulloy, W.T. 1954. The McKean Site in Northeastern Wyoming. Southwestern Journal of Anthropology 10:432-460.
- Mulloy, W.T. 1959. The Ceremonial Center of Vinapu. Actas del XXXIII Congreso Internacional de Americanistas. San José, Costa Rica.
- Mulloy, W.T. 1968. Preliminary Report of Archaeological Field Work, February–July, 1968, Easter Island. New York, N.Y.: Easter Island Committee, International Fund for Monuments.
- Mulloy, W.T. 1970. Preliminary Report of the Restoration of Ahu Vai Uri Easter Island. Bulletin of the International Fund for Monuments, No. 2.
- Mulloy, W.T. 1974. Contemplate the Navel of the World. Americas 26 (4): 25–33.
- Mulloy, W.T. 1975. Investigation and Restoration of the Ceremonial Center of Orongo, Easter Island. Bulletin of the International Fund for Monuments, No. 4.
- Mulloy, W.T., E.C. Olson, R. Snodgrasse, and H.H. Turney-High. 1976. The Hagen Site: A Prehistoric Village on the Lower Yellowstone. Lincoln, Neb.: J & L Reprint Co.
- Mulloy, W.T., and G. Figueroa. 1978. The A Kivi-Vai Teka Complex and its Relationship to Easter Island Architectural Prehistory. Honolulu: Social Science Research Institute, University of Hawaii at Manoa.
- Mulloy, W.T., and S.R. Fischer. 1993. Easter Island Studies: Contributions to the History of Rapanui in Memory of William T. Mulloy. Oxford: Oxbow Books.
- Mulloy, W.T., World Monuments Fund, and Easter Island Foundation. 1995. The Easter Island Bulletins of William Mulloy. New York; Houston: World Monuments Fund; Easter Island Foundation.
- Norwegian Archaeological Expedition to Easter Island and the East Pacific, T. Heyerdahl, E.N. Ferdon, W.T. Mulloy, A. Skjølsvold, C.S. Smith. 1961. Archaeology of Easter Island. Stockholm; Santa Fe, N.M.: Forum Pub. House; distributed by The School of American Research.
- Reiter, P., W.T. Mulloy, and E.H. Blumenthal. 1940. Preliminary Report of the Jemez Excavation at Nanishagi, New Mexico. Albuquerque, N.M., University of New Mexico Press.
