= Easter Island Foundation =

US-based non-profit organization

The Easter Island Foundation (EIF) is a public 501(c)(3) non-profit organization registered in California. Established in 1989, the foundation supports the preservation of Rapa Nui (Easter Island) heritage and other Polynesian islands and culture, primarily through educational initiatives. It is governed by a volunteer Board of Directors comprising professionals from various fields, including anthropology, art, education, information technology, management, and fundraising, all of whom share an interest in the history and culture of Rapa Nui and other Polynesian islands.

== Mission ==
Easter Island, located in the southeastern Pacific Ocean between Tahiti and South America, is known for its significant archaeological sites, many of which have been the subject of international scientific research. Despite ongoing studies, numerous aspects of the island's past remain unresolved. In recent years, increased tourism, development, and limited infrastructure have posed challenges to the preservation of its cultural and archaeological heritage.

== Objectives ==
- To promote an interest in research on Easter Island and other Pacific islands by anthropologists, archaeologists, linguists, environmentalists, and members of other scientific, historical, and cultural disciplines.
- To work toward the conservation and preservation of Easter Island's cultural heritage and environmental character as well as historic sites and monuments in Polynesia.
- To inform and educate local, national, and international groups and communities in addition to the general public with regard to Easter Island's unique heritage and priceless monumental treasures.
- To facilitate communication about Easter Island and other Pacific islands among scientific disciplines, historians, and other interested parties through publication of journals, books, guides, and other media-related sources and conferences.
- To develop an endowment fund through investments, bequests, corporate and Easter Island Foundation contributions, and other related sources — to provide a pool of financial resources for the support of the Foundation's programs.
- To help support the William Mulloy Library for the study of Easter Island and various related disciplines, in association with the island's Museo Antropológico Padre Sebastián Englert.
- To provide a scholarship program for promising Rapa Nui secondary and college students to ensure them an opportunity for advanced academic studies.
- To encourage economic development activities on Easter Island that will benefit the Rapa Nui and that will honor and maintain the cultural and environmental character of the island.

== Activities ==
The EIF helps fund archaeological research on Rapa Nui and other Polynesian islands, and provides Rapa Nui students with scholarships for higher education. The EIF also sponsors conferences about Rapa Nui and Polynesia.

== See also ==
- History of Easter Island
