= Father Sebastian Englert Anthropological Museum =

Anthropology museum on Hanga Roa, Rapa Nui

- Museo Antropológico Padre Sebastián Englert
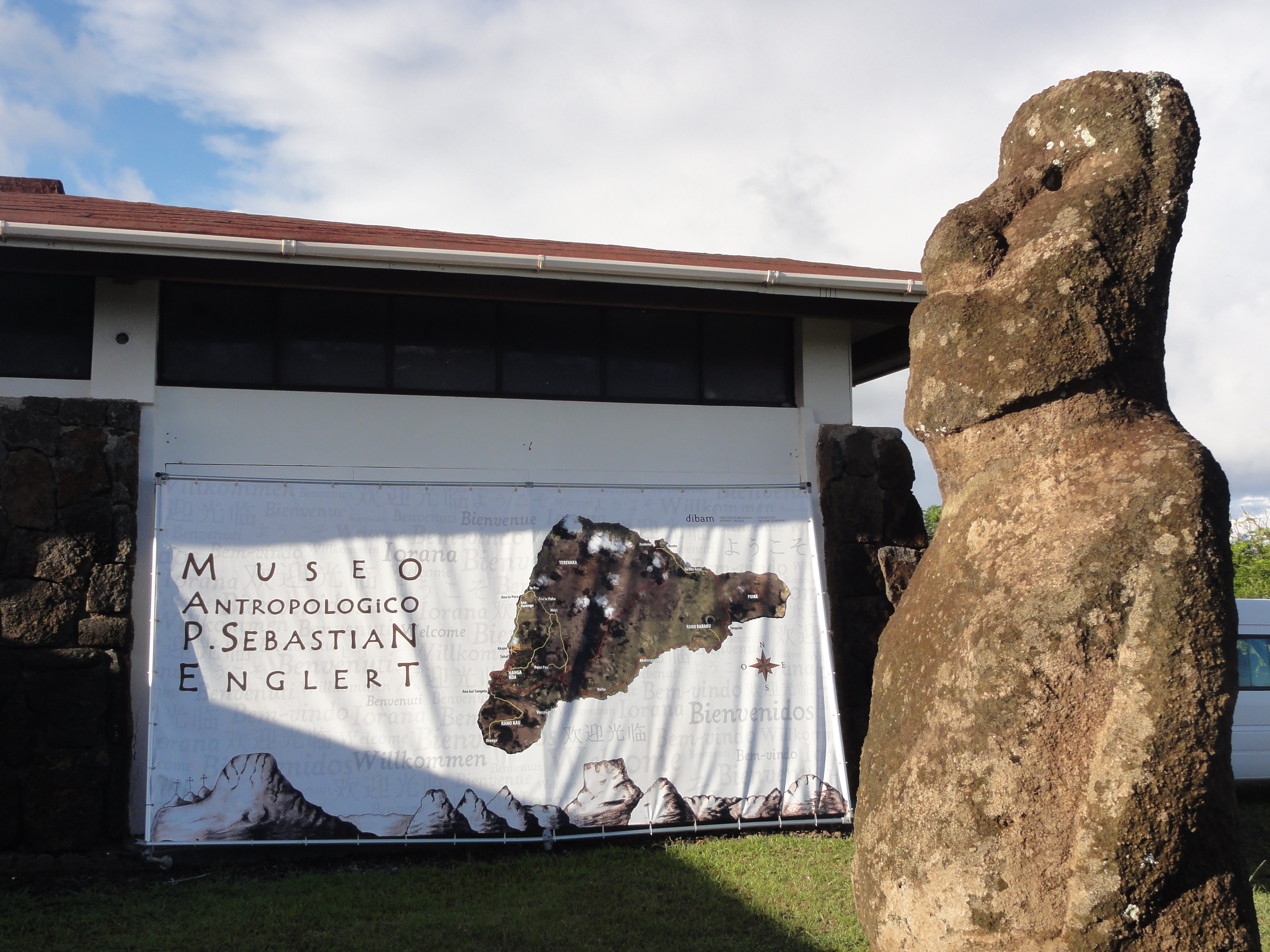
- Established: 1973
- Location: Hanga Roa; Isla de Pascua; Chile
- Coordinates: 27°08′14″S 109°25′27″W
- Type: Archaeological and ethnographic
- Collection size: 15,000
- Director: Paula Valenzuela Contreras
- Curators: Francisco Torres Hochstetter; Pelayo Tucki Make (former)
- Website: museorapanui.gob.cl

The Father Sebastian Englert Anthropological Museum is a museum in the town of Hanga Roa on Rapa Nui (Easter Island) in Chilean Polynesia. Named for the Bavarian missionary, Fr. Sebastian Englert, OFM Cap., the museum was founded in 1973 and is dedicated to the conservation of the Rapa Nui cultural patrimony.

The museum is administered by the Chilean National Service of Cultural Heritage (Spanish: Servicio Nacional del Patrimonio Cultural, SNPC), and houses the William Mulloy Library.

== Background ==
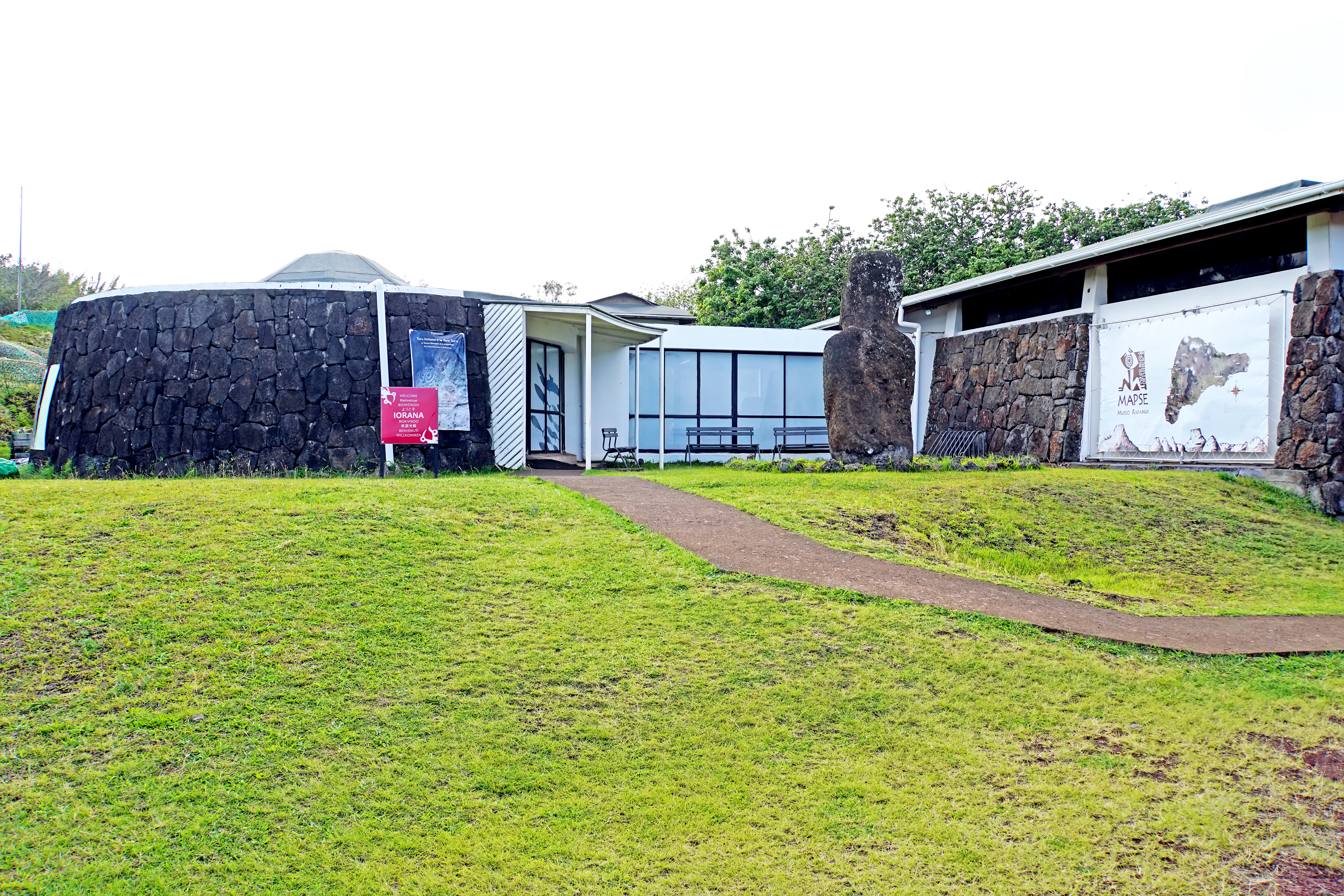
Museum grounds

The museum was founded in 1973 and is named after Sebastian Englert, who also recorded the language and culture of the island. As part of his research he formed a large collection of objects relating to his work, which ultimately formed the foundation of the museum's collection.

== Collections ==
The museum collection contains approximately 15,000 objects. These include items collected by Sebastian Englert, as well as the archives of decades of archaeological investigation. Archaeological material also includes human remains from excavations on the island. The museum houses the only female mo‘ai, as well as one of the coral eyes that were placed in the mo‘ai. There are obsidian stone tools, wood statuettes, ancient fish hooks, as well as a photographic collection and archives of traditional music. The museum also includes displays of rongorongo glyphs.

Natural science collections are also part of the work of the museum. One significant aspect of the zoological collections are the bones of cetaceans there, including two blue whale vertebra.

The William Mulloy Library forms part of museum and is an extensive collection of scientific literature about the island.

=== Objects in overseas collections ===
Due to legacies of colonial extraction from Rapa Nui, as well as the work of international researchers on the island, objects that are culturally significant are held in museums around the world. The University of Wyoming Art Museum holds a collection that was constituted by William Mulloy Jr., who was a former anthropologist at the university. It comprises 180 small sculptures carved from a variety of materials, including volcanic rock, stone and wood. There are over 70 mo'ai in overseas collections, including at the British Museum, Smithsonian Institution's National Museum of Natural History, and other institutions.

==== Gallery of objects in overseas collections ====
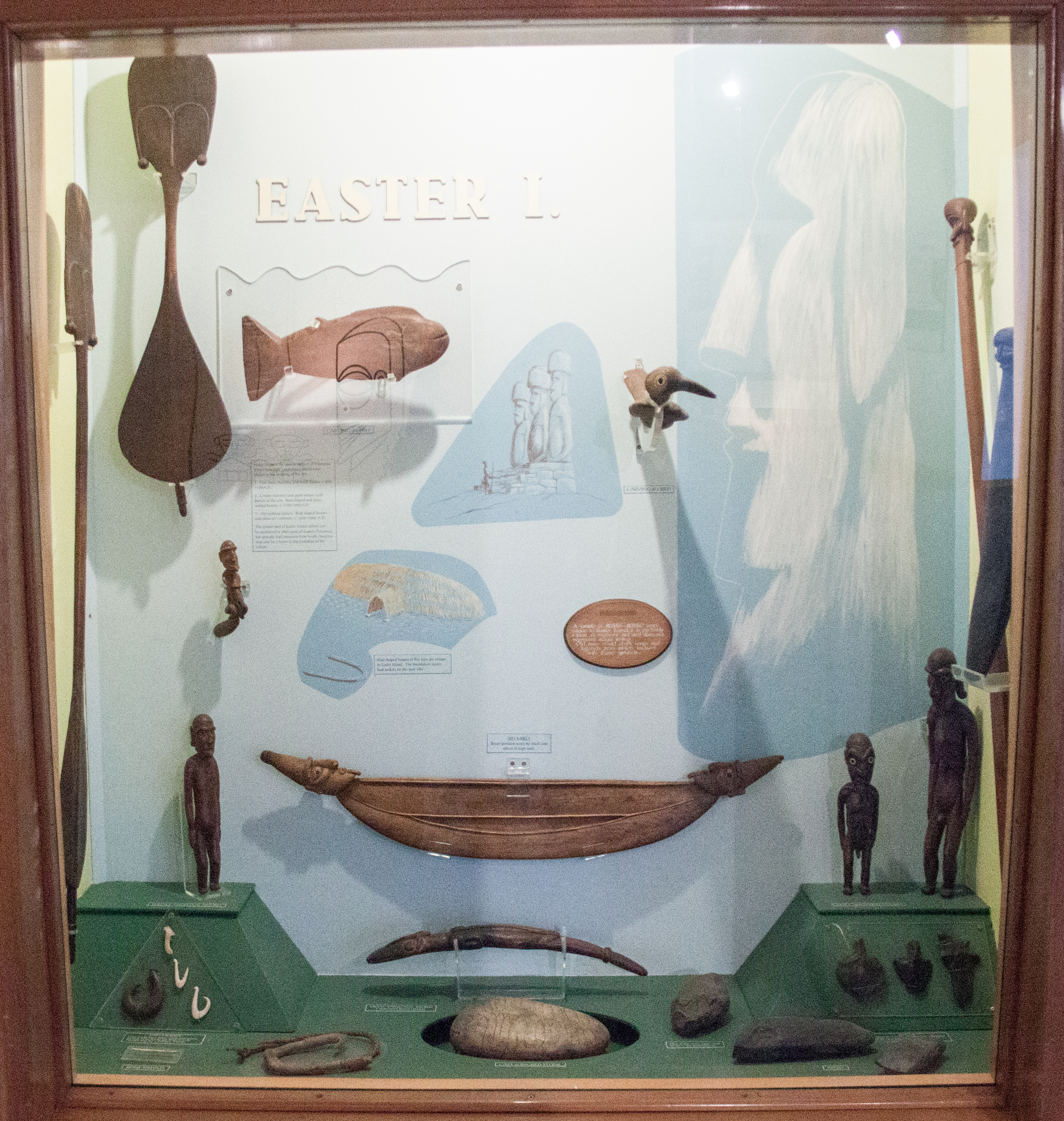
Display of Rapa Nui objects at Otago Museum

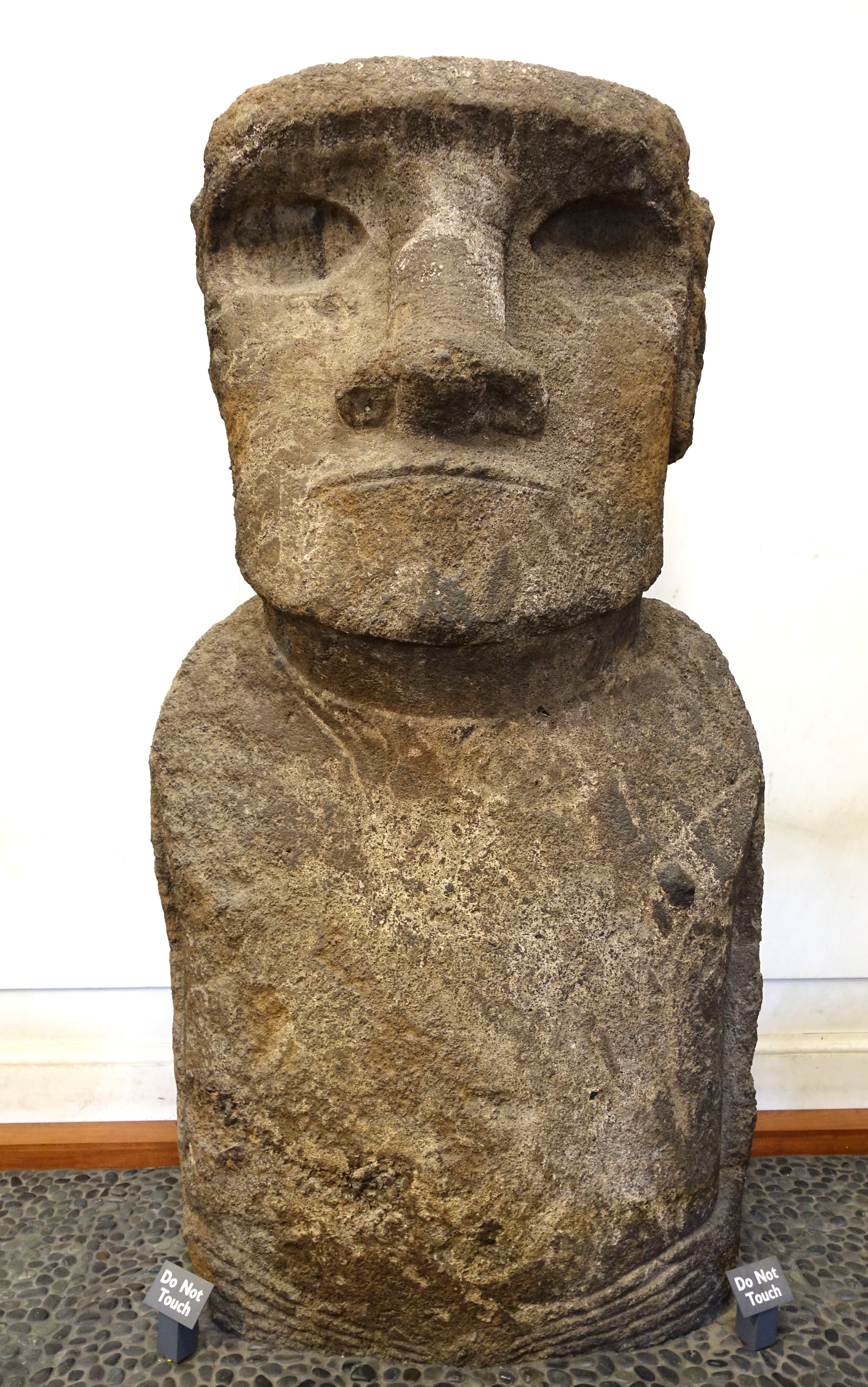
Mo'ai at National Museum of Natural History

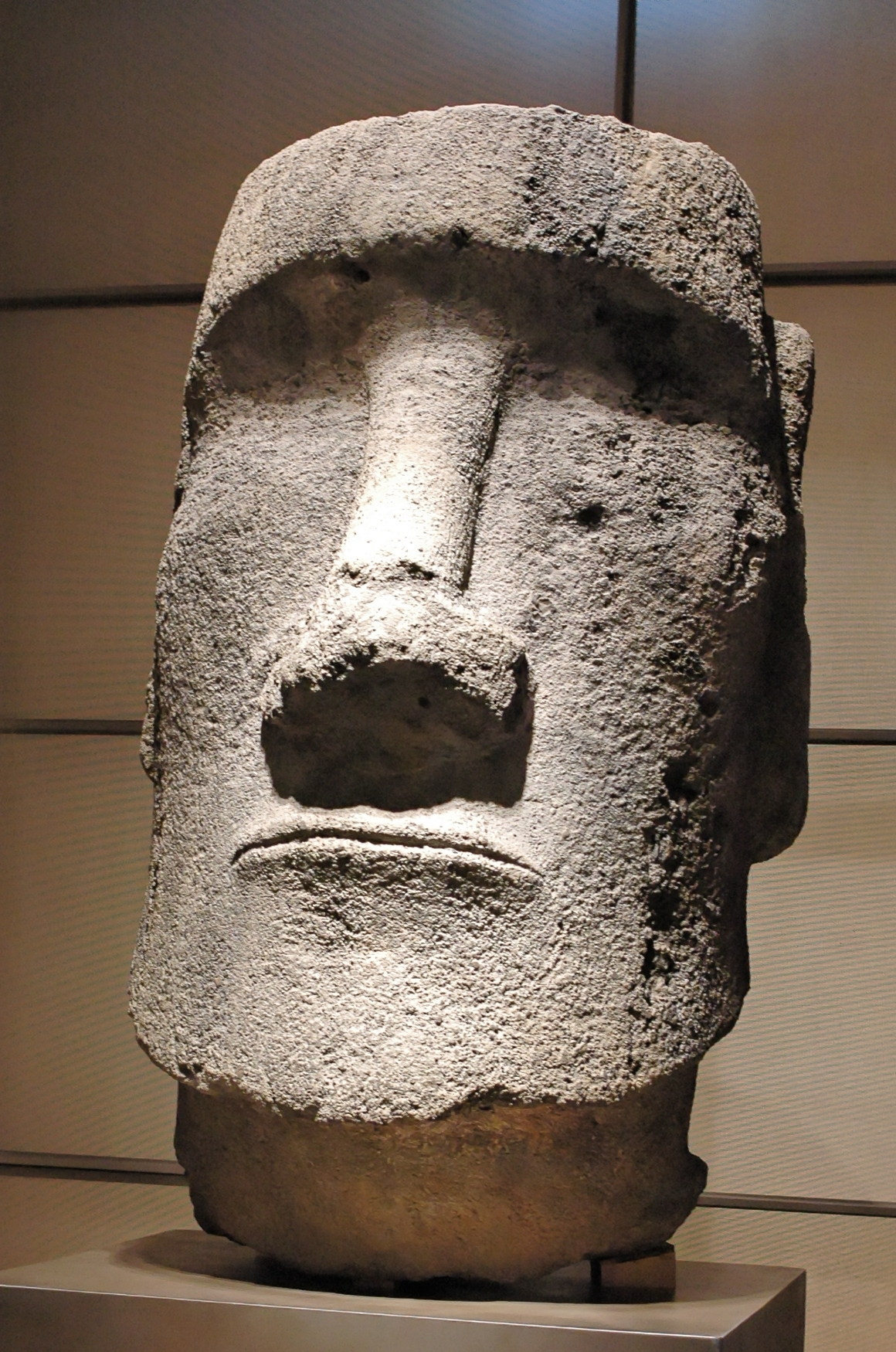
Mo'ai held at Musée de l'Homme

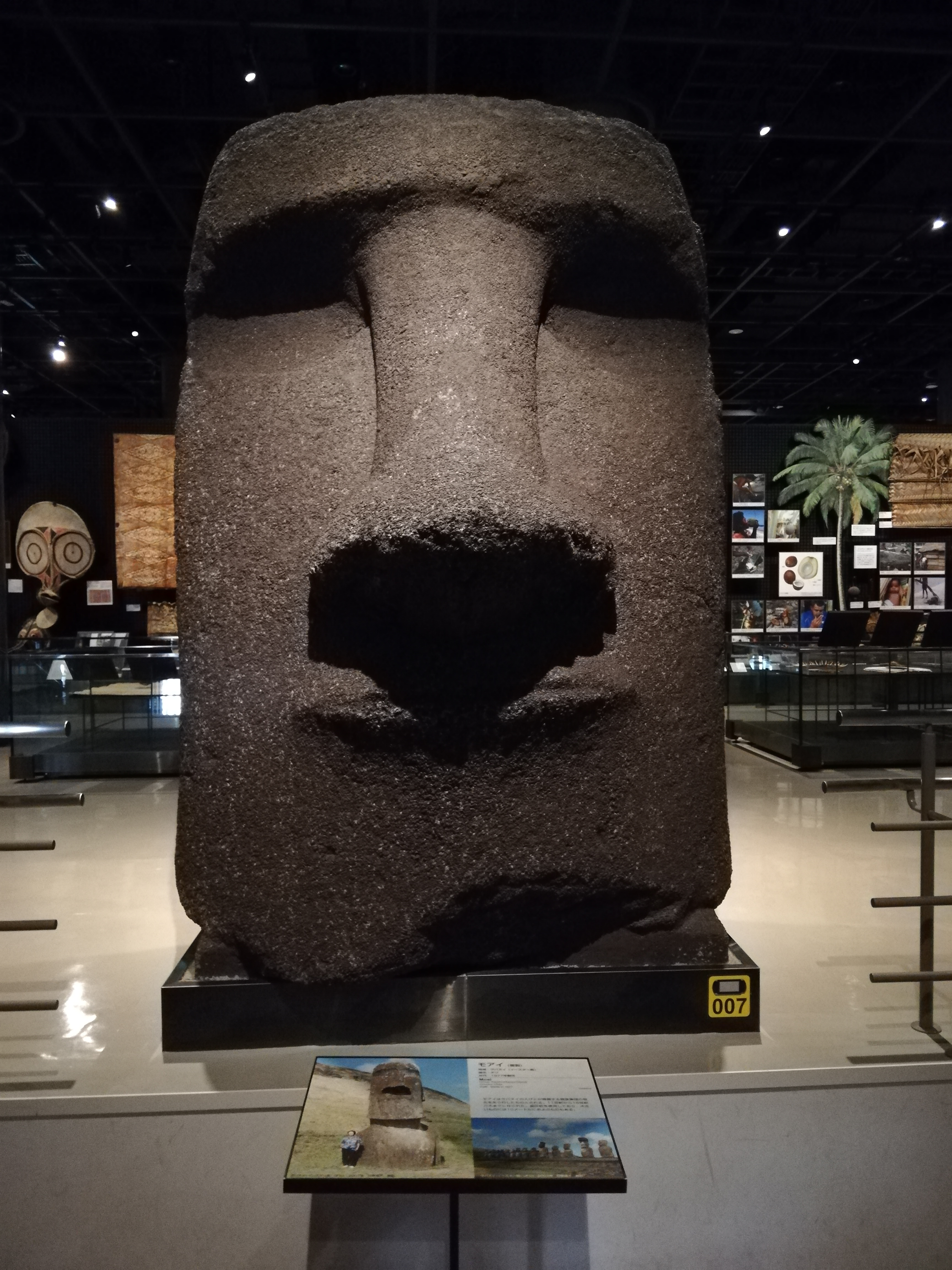
Mo'ai held at National Museum of Ethnology, Osaka

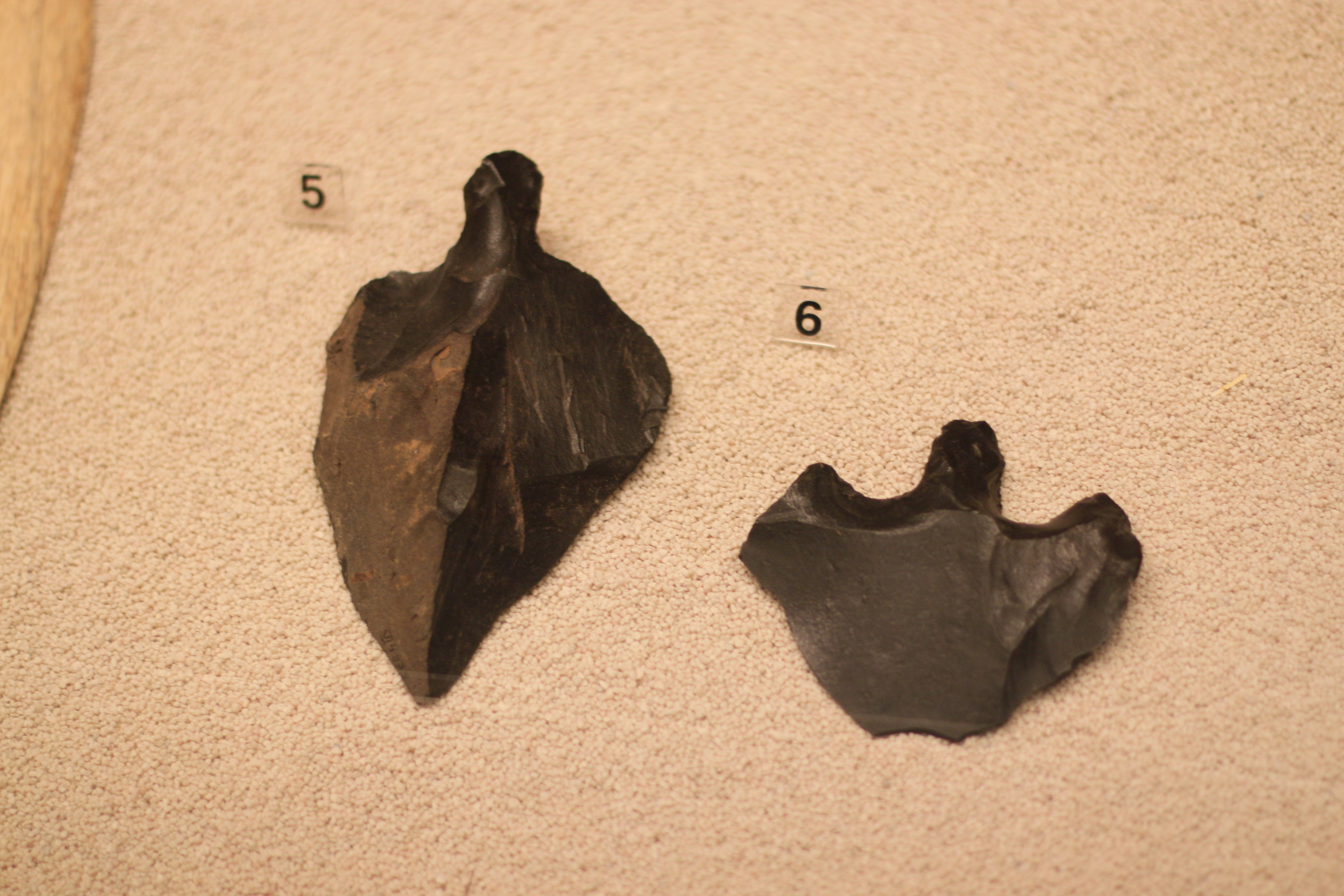
Tools from Ethnological Museum, Berlin

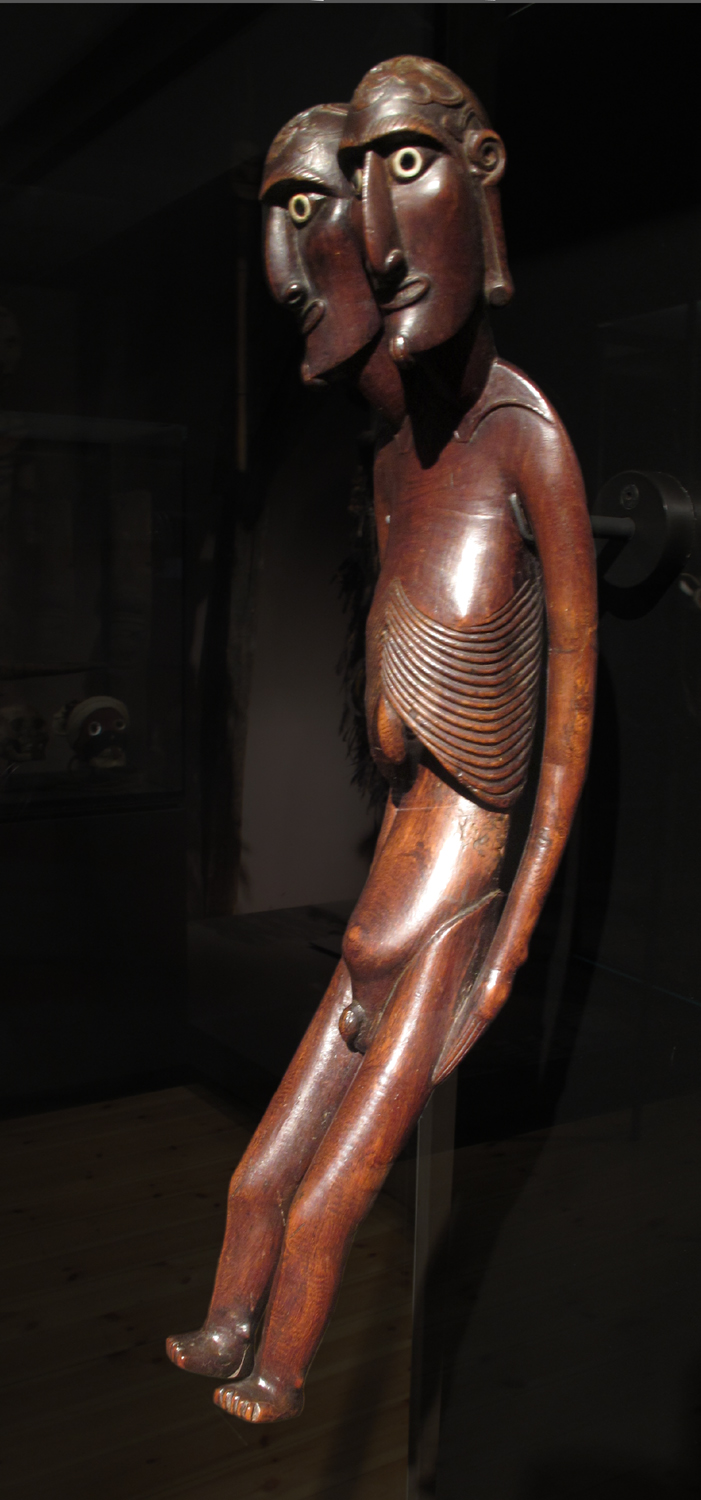
Wooden figure at Museum La Rochelle

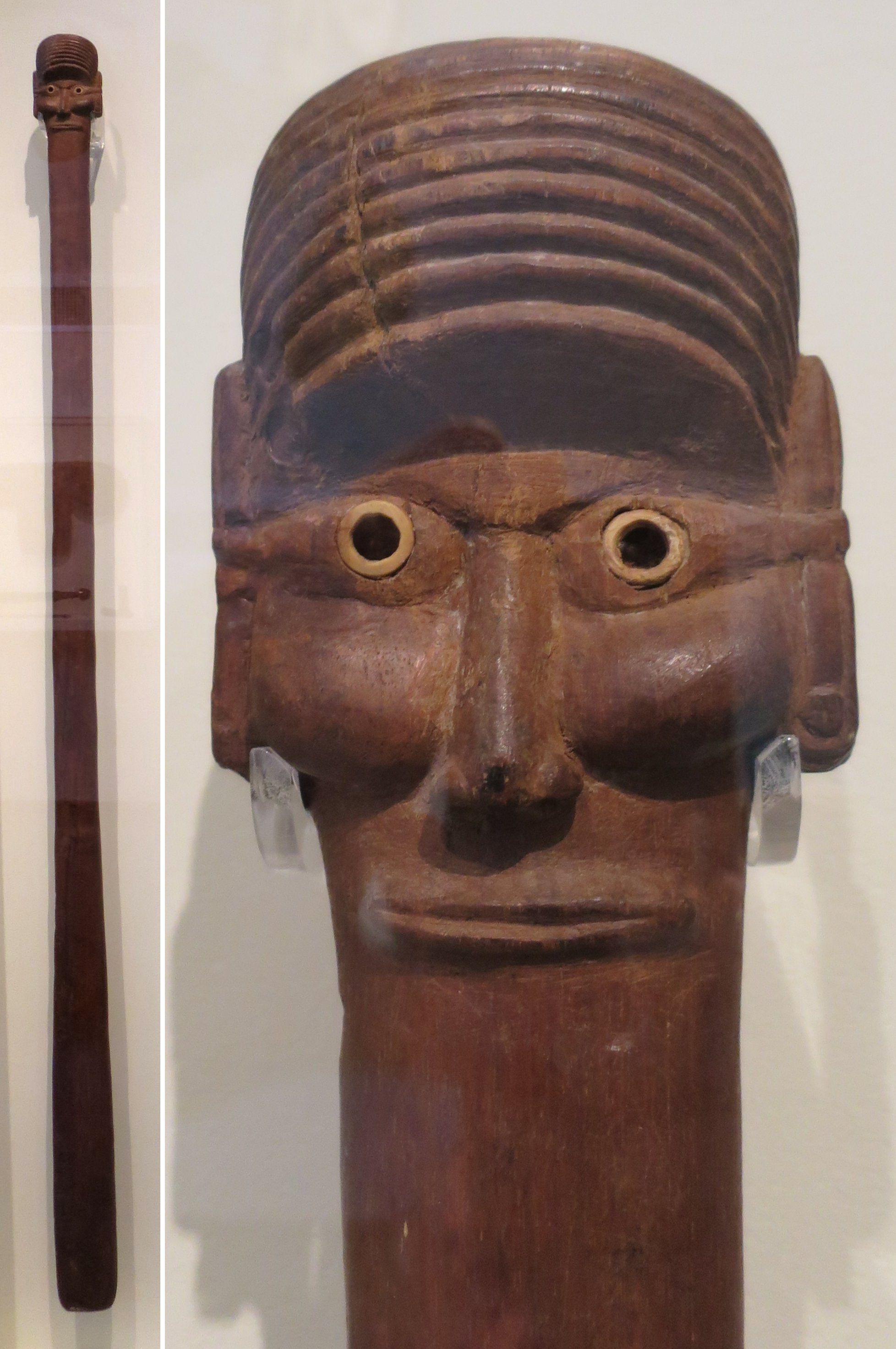
Staff or club at Honolulu Art Museum

=== Repatriation ===
==== Human remains ====
Since 2013 there has been independent program of repatriation and reburial of ivi tupana (human remains). This program is led by members of the Rapa Nui community in collaboration with researchers and the museum. In the context of Rapa Nui and repatriation, human remains are not considered property of the Chilean state and must be returned directly to communities.

==== Kon-Tiki voyage material ====
In 2019 the government of Norway and Chile signed an agreement to enable the return of cultural artefacts and human remains that were taken as part of Thor Heyerdahl's research between the 1950s and 1980s. The returned objects are to be transferred to the museum collection.

==== Mo'ai ====
In 2006 Chilean artist Rosa Velasco organised the repatriation of the mo'ai that she had inherited from her father. In 2018 the government of New Zealand repatriated two mo'ai, from Te Papa Museum and Otago Museum. On display at the British Museum is Hoa Hakananai’a, a mo'ai whose return to the Rapa Nui people was formally requested in 2019. The British Museum reportedly agreed to a loan.

==== Digital repatriation ====
As part of the ongoing partnership to enable repatriation of the collections held at the University of Wyoming, a programme of digital repatriation was ongoing as of 2021. This programme involves the sharing of digital models and files of objects in the collection, with the goal of hosting simultaneous exhibitions in both museums, using the same materials in future.

==== Gallery of objects subject to repatriation requests ====
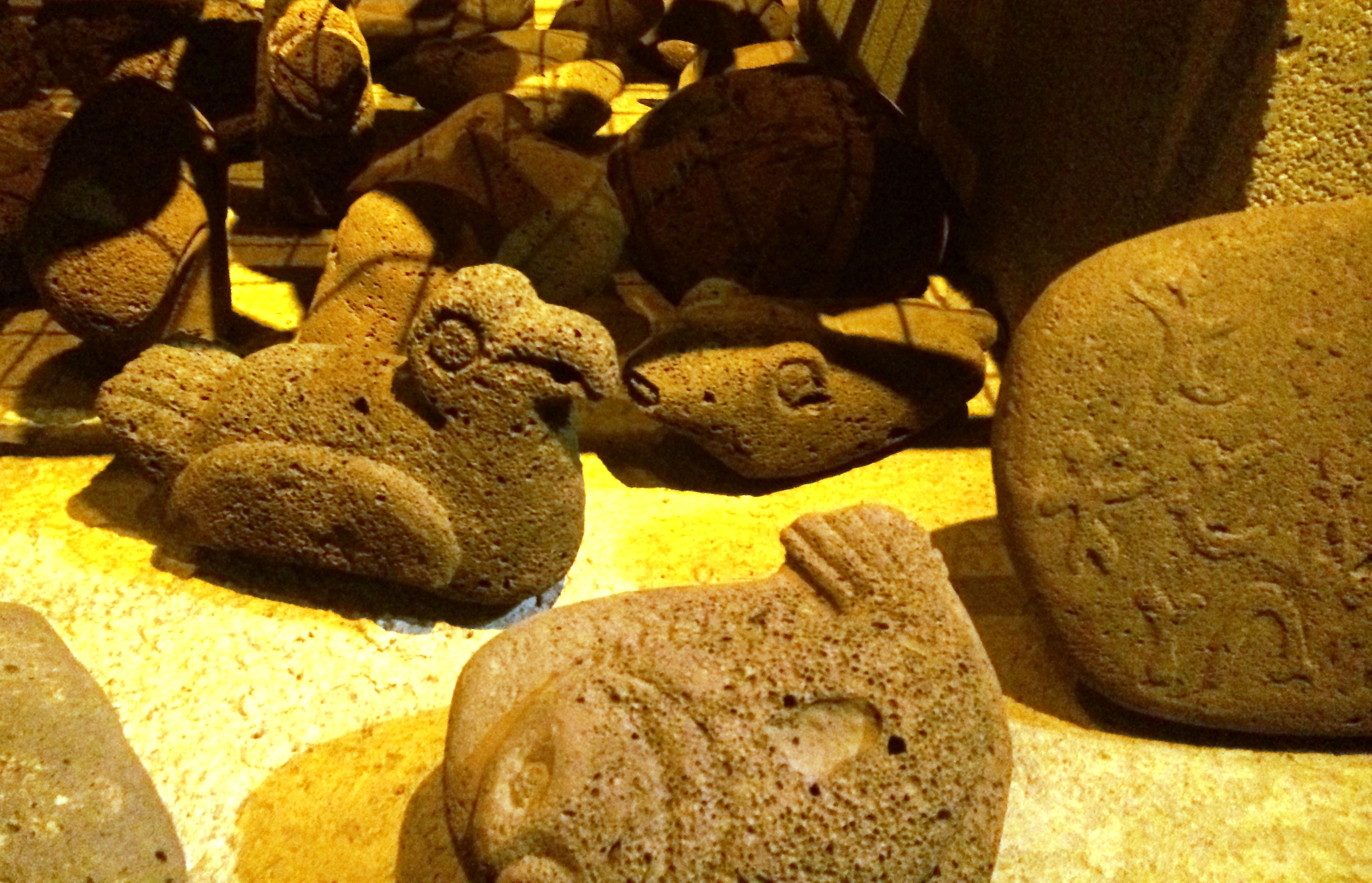
Potential objects for repatriation from the Kon-Tiki Museum

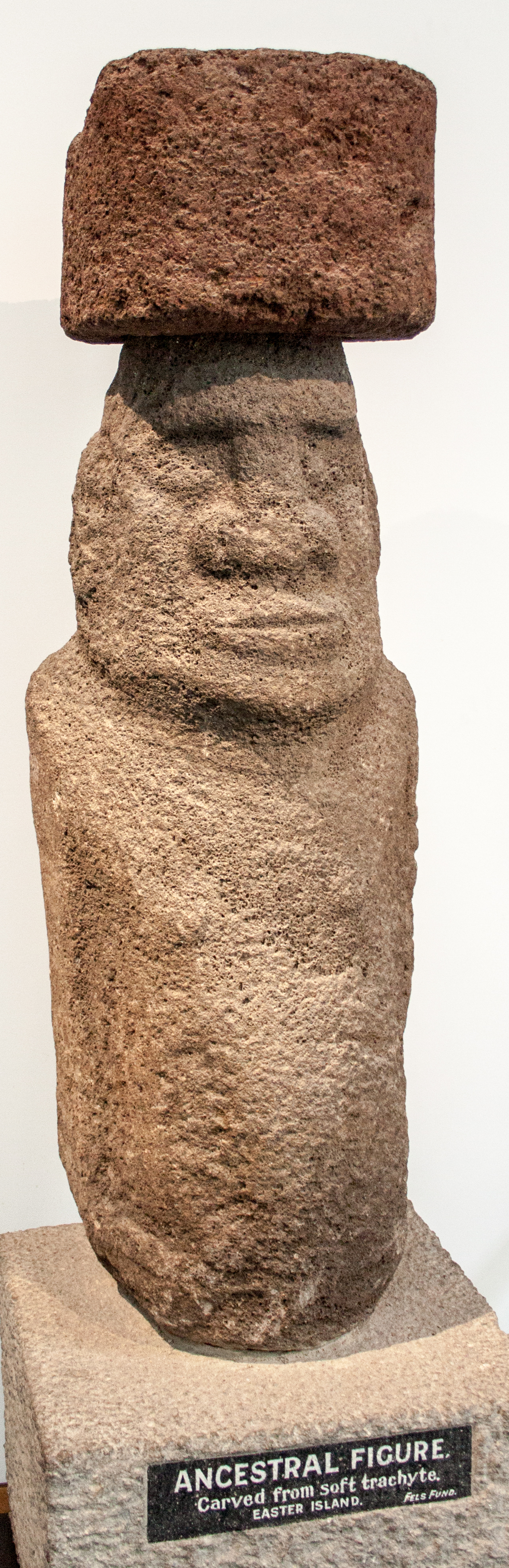
Mo'ai from Otago Museum, pre-repatriation

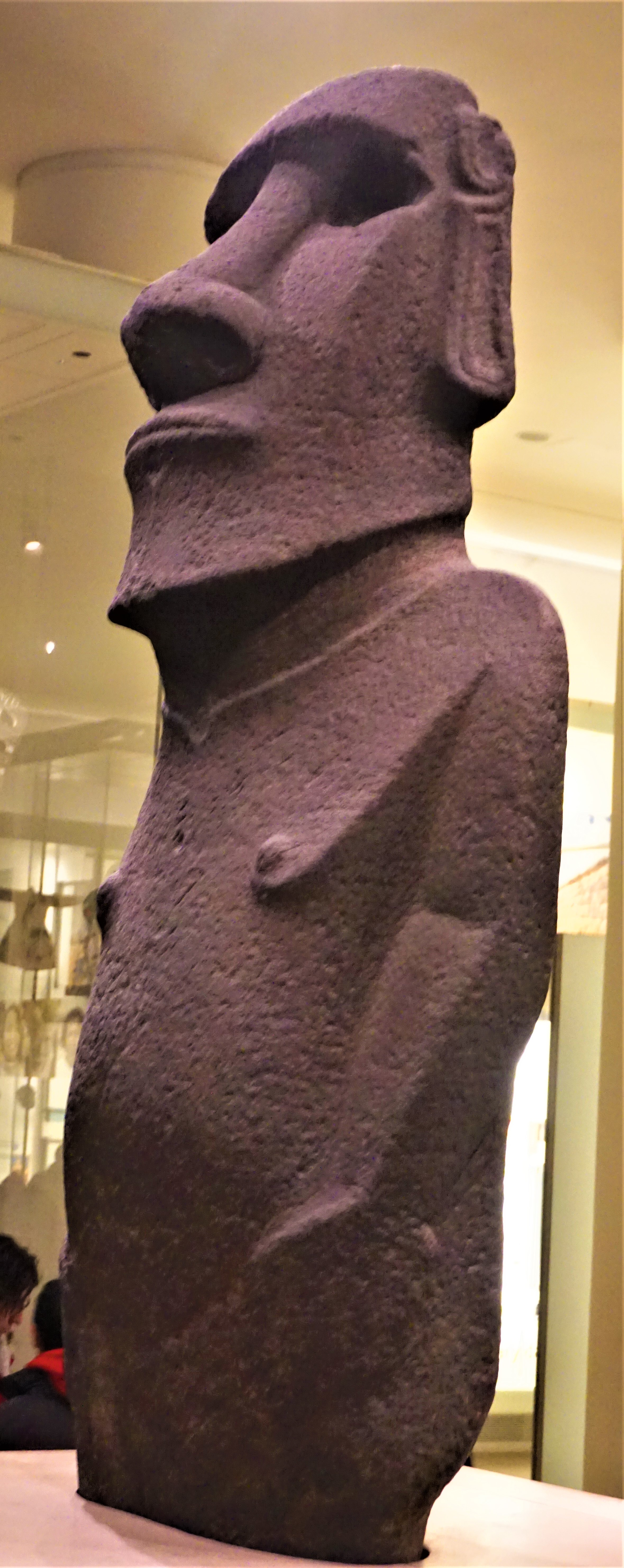
Hoa Hakananai'a

== Awards ==
In 2006 the museum was presented with an award from UNESCO for the "INFOLAC Web 2005 Contest, as the best museum on line with a scientific foundation".
