= Ahu Vinapu =

Archaeological site on Easter Island, Chile

Coordinates: 27.176383°S 109.406356°W

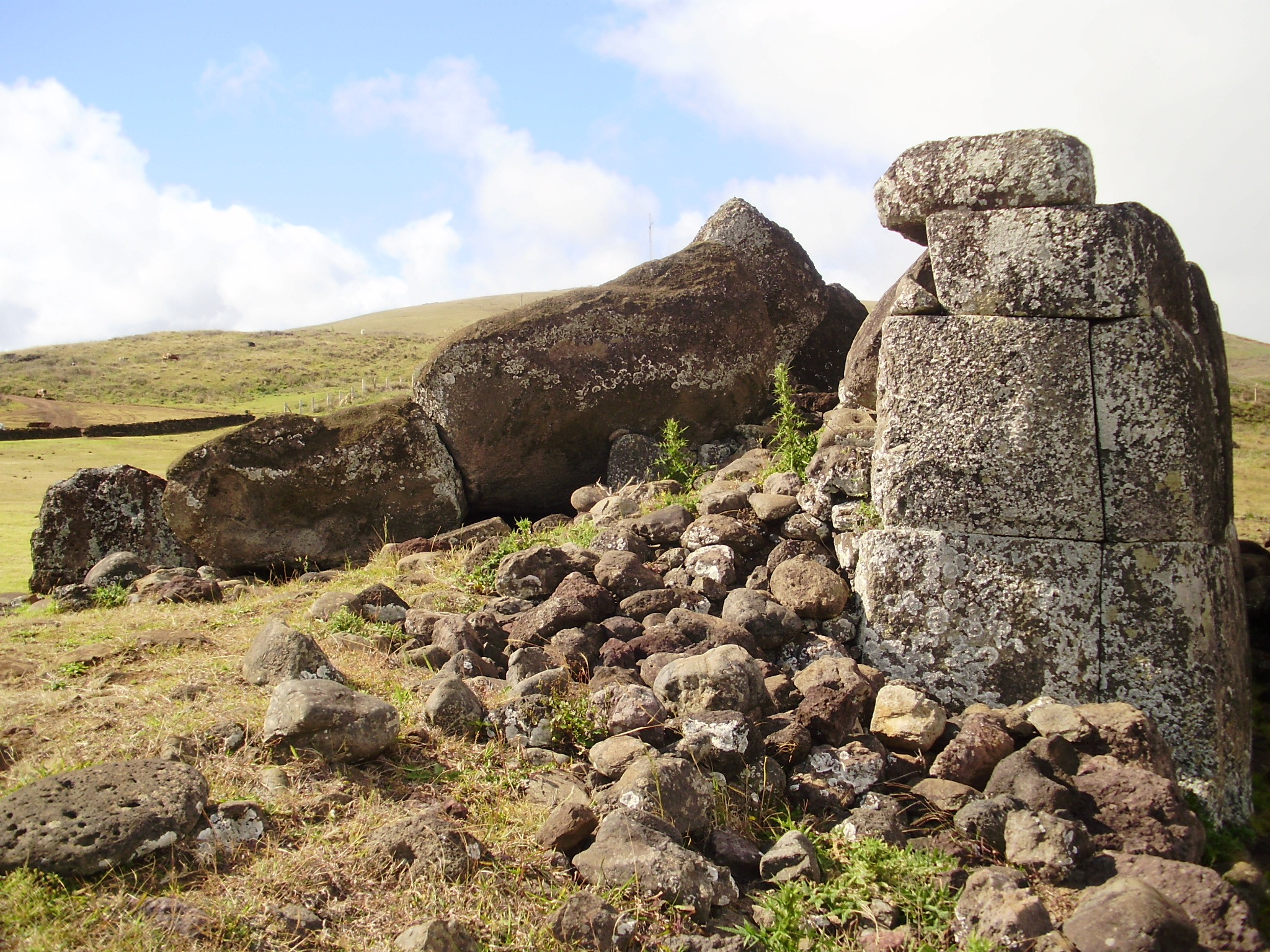
Ahu Vinapú

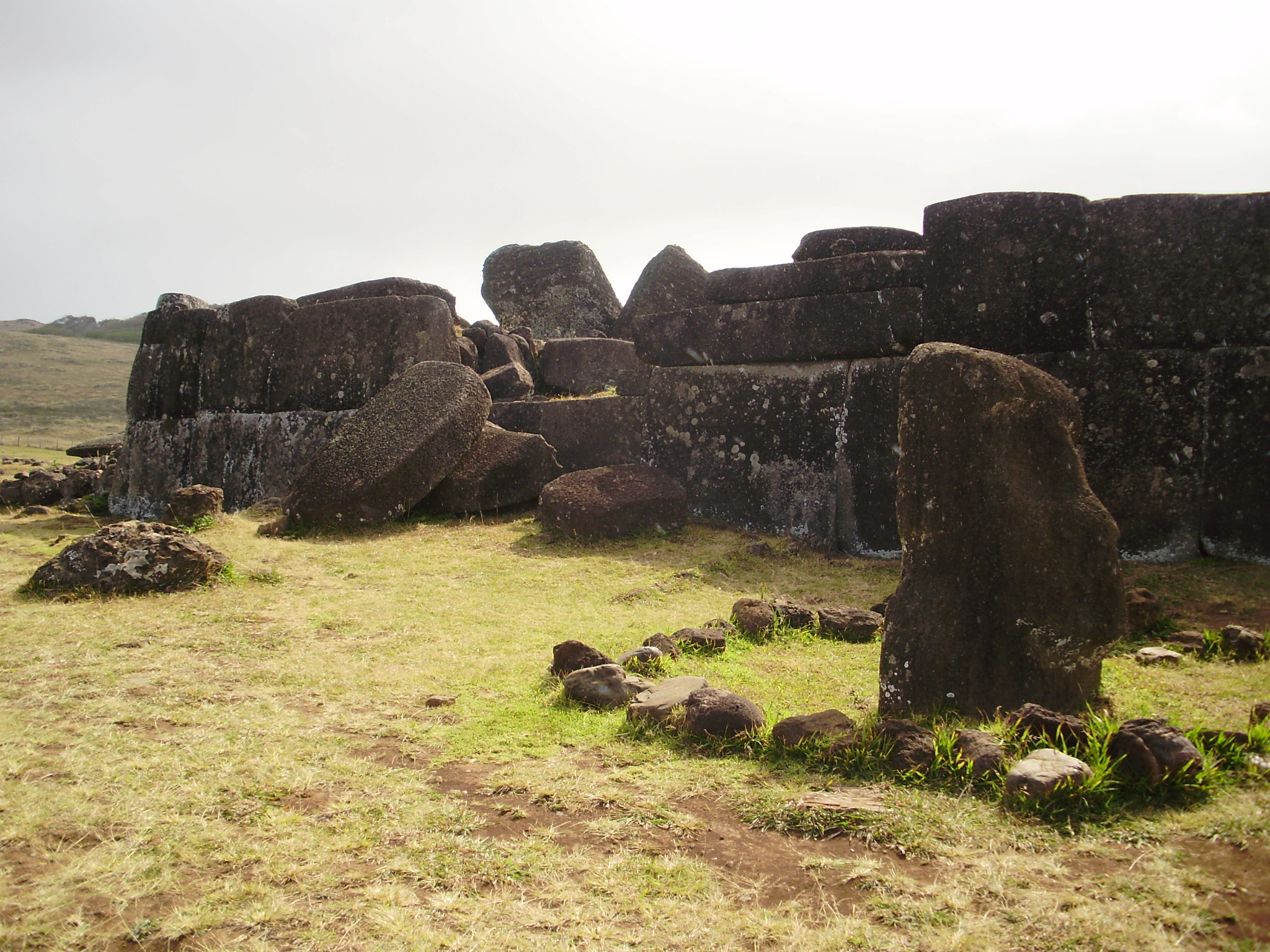
Ahu Vinapú

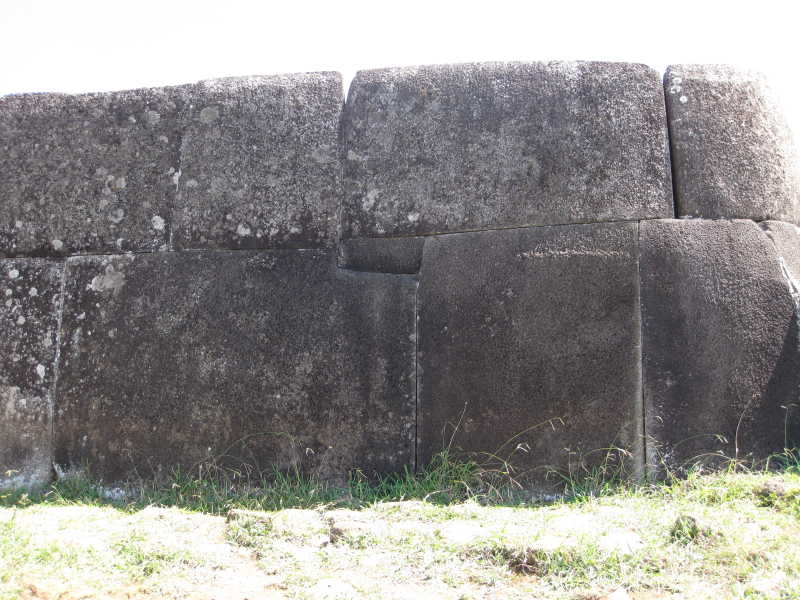
A part of Ahu Vinapu, showing the precision of the stonemasonry

Ahu Vinapu is an archaeological site on Rapa Nui (Easter Island) in Eastern Polynesia.

The ceremonial center of Vinapu includes one of the larger ahu on Rapa Nui. The ahu exhibits extraordinary stonemasonry consisting of large, carefully fitted slabs of basalt. The American archaeologist William Mulloy investigated the site in 1958.

Thor Heyerdahl believed that the accurately fitted stonework showed contact with Peru, especially in comparison to the stone walls of Sacsayhuaman. The stone wall faces towards sunrise at Winter Solstice.

Vinapu is part of the Rapa Nui National Park, which UNESCO has declared a World Heritage Site.
