= Austronesian peoples =

Speakers of Austronesian languages

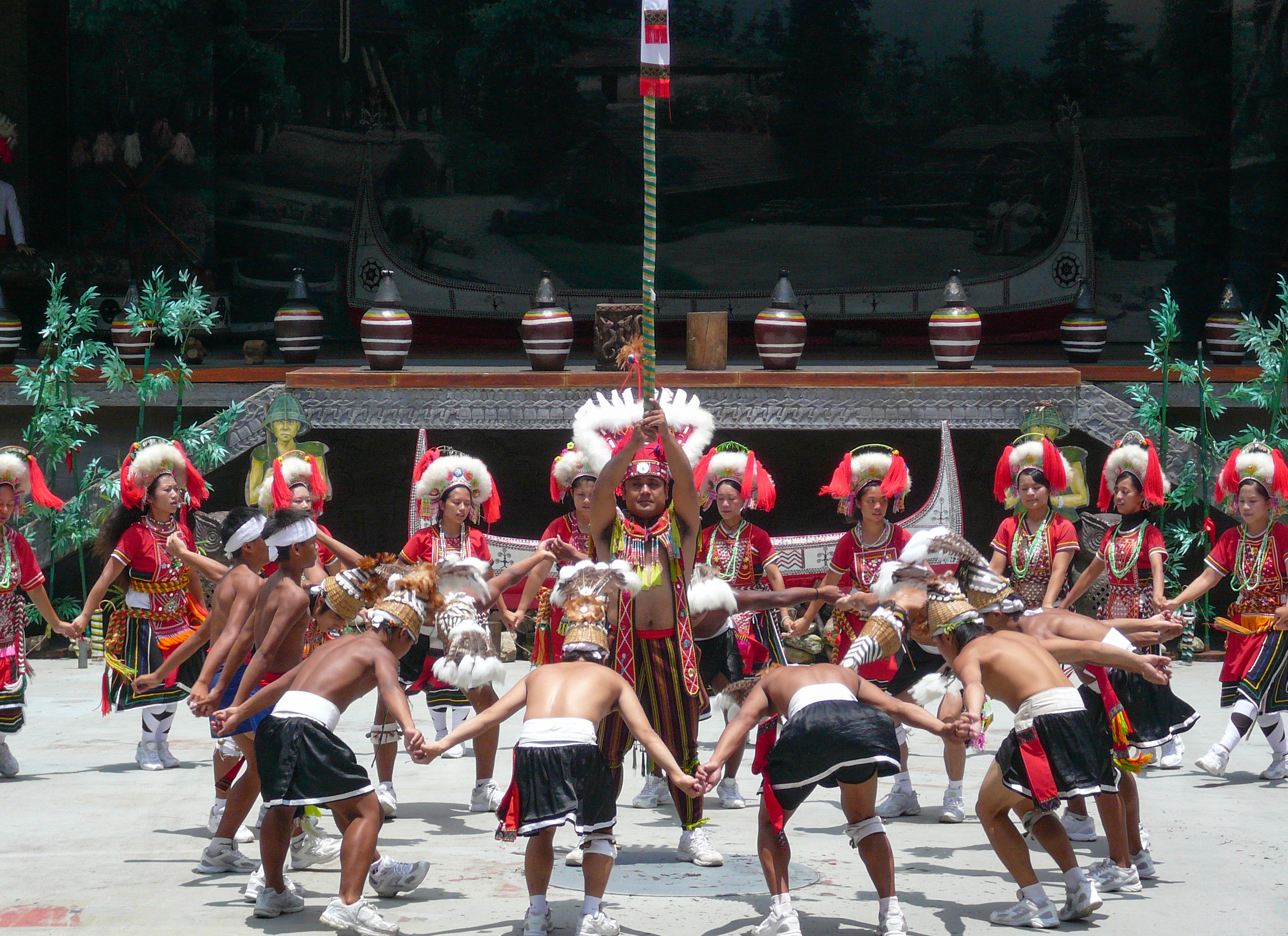
- Amis people of Taiwan performing a traditional tribal dance

Total population
- c. 400 million

Regions with significant populations
- Indonesia: c. 270 million (2020)
- Philippines: c. 112 million (2024)
- Madagascar: c. 24 million (2016)
- Malaysia: c. 21.3 million (2023)
- United States: c. 6 million
- Papua New Guinea: c. 2 million
- Thailand: c. 1.9 million
- East Timor: c. 1.2 million (2015)
- Vietnam: c. 1.2 million (2019)
- Canada: c. 1 million (2021)
- Fiji: c. 936,375 (2005)
- New Zealand: c. 855,000 (2006)
- Taiwan: c. 644,686 (2026)
- Singapore: c. 576,300
- Australia: c. 500,000 (2021)
- Hawaii: c. 500,000 (2023)
- Solomon Islands: c. 479,000 (2005)
- Brunei: c. 450,000 (2006)
- Cambodia: c. 302,000 (2019)
- Vanuatu: c. 272,000
- French Polynesia: c. 230,000 (2017)
- Samoa: c. 195,000 (2016)
- Guam: c. 150,000 (2010)
- Kiribati: c. 119,940 (2020)
- New Caledonia: c. 106,000 (2019)
- Federated States of Micronesia: c. 102,000
- Tonga: c. 100,000 (2016)
- Suriname: c. 93,000 (2017)
- Marshall Islands: c. 72,000 (2015)
- Mayotte: c. 57,100 (2017)
- American Samoa: c. 55,000 (2010)
- Sri Lanka: c. 40,189 (2012)
- Myanmar: c. 31,600 (2019)
- Northern Mariana Islands: c. 19,000
- Palau: c. 16,500 (2011)
- Wallis and Futuna: c. 11,600 (2018)
- Nauru: c. 11,200 (2011)
- Tuvalu: c. 11,200 (2012)
- Cook Islands: c. 9,300 (2010)
- Hainan: c. 8,500
- Easter Island (Rapa Nui): c. 2,290 (2002)
- Niue: c. 1,937

Languages
- Austronesian languages; Other official languages of native countries

Religion
- Islam; Christianity; Hinduism; Buddhism; Indigenous Austronesian religions

The Austronesian peoples, sometimes referred to as Austronesian-speaking peoples, are a large collection of peoples who speak Austronesian languages, having settled in Taiwan, maritime Southeast Asia, parts of mainland Southeast Asia, Micronesia, coastal New Guinea, Island Melanesia, Polynesia, and Madagascar. They also include indigenous ethnic minorities in Vietnam, Cambodia, Myanmar, Thailand and Hainan. The nations and territories predominantly populated by Austronesian-speaking peoples are sometimes known collectively as Austronesia.

The group originated from a prehistoric seaborne migration, known as the Austronesian expansion, from Taiwan, c. 3000 to 1500 BCE. Austronesians reached the Batanes Islands in the northernmost Philippines by around 2200 BCE. They used sails some time before 2000 BCE. In conjunction with their use of other maritime technologies (notably catamarans, outrigger boats, lashed-lug boats, and the crab claw sail), this enabled phases of rapid dispersal into the islands of the Indo-Pacific, culminating in the settlement of New Zealand c. 1250 CE. During the initial part of the migrations, they encountered and assimilated (or were assimilated by) the Paleolithic populations that had migrated earlier into Maritime Southeast Asia and New Guinea. They reached as far as Easter Island to the east, Madagascar to the west, New Zealand to the south, and Hawaii to the north. At the furthest extent, they might have also reached the Americas.

Aside from language, Austronesian peoples widely share cultural characteristics, including such traditions and traditional technologies as lashed-lug shipbuilding, tattooing, stilt houses, jade carving, wetland agriculture, and various rock art motifs. They also share domesticated plants and animals that were carried along with the migrations, including rice, bananas, coconuts, breadfruit, Dioscorea yams, taro, paper mulberry, chickens, pigs, and dogs.

== History of research ==
The linguistic connections between Madagascar, Polynesia, and Southeast Asia, particularly the similarities between Malagasy, Malay, and Polynesian numerals, were recognized early in the colonial era by European authors. The first formal publication on these relationships was in 1708 by Dutch Orientalist Adriaan Reland, who recognized a "common language" from Madagascar to western Polynesia, although Dutch explorer Cornelis de Houtman observed linguistic links between Madagascar and the Malay Archipelago a century earlier, in 1603. German naturalist Johann Reinhold Forster, who traveled with James Cook on his second voyage, also recognized the similarities of Polynesian languages to those of Island Southeast Asia. In his book Observations Made during a Voyage round the World (1778), he posited that the ultimate origins of the Polynesians might have been the lowland regions of the Philippines and proposed that they arrived to the islands via long-distance voyaging.

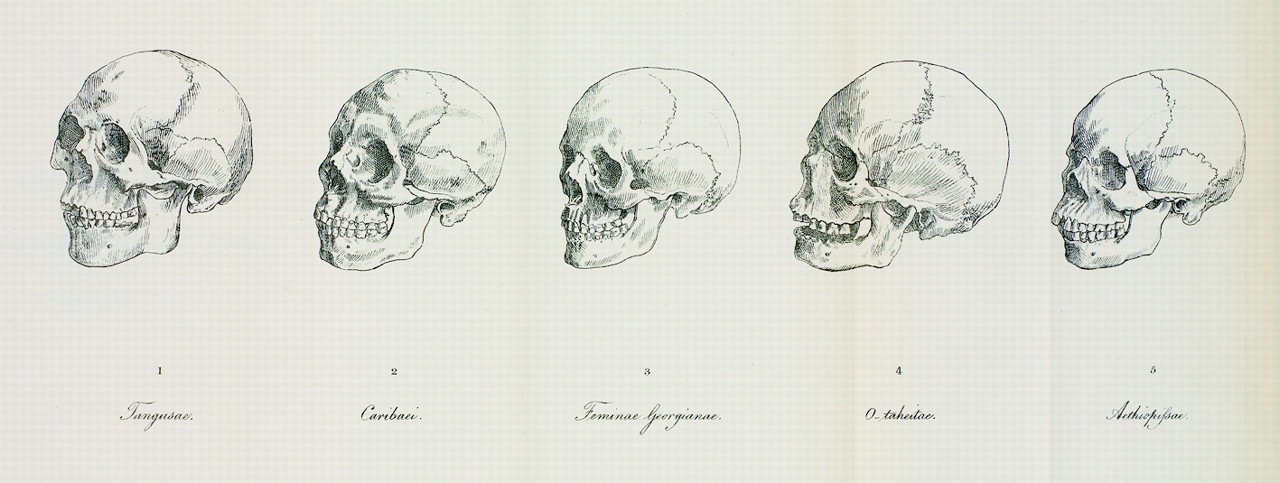
Skulls representing Johann Friedrich Blumenbach's "five races" in De Generis Humani Varietate Nativa (1795). The Tahitian skull labeled "O-taheitae" represented what he called the "Malay race".

The Spanish philologist Lorenzo Hervás later devoted a large part of his Idea dell'universo (1778–1787) to the establishment of a language family linking the Malay Peninsula, the Maldives, Madagascar, Indonesia (Sunda Islands and Moluccas), the Philippines, and the Pacific Islands eastward to Easter Island. Multiple other authors corroborated this classification (except for the erroneous inclusion of Maldivian), and the language family came to be known as "Malayo-Polynesian", first coined by the German linguist Franz Bopp in 1841 (malayisch-polynesisch). The connections between Southeast Asia, Madagascar, and the Pacific Islands were also noted by other European explorers, including the Orientalist William Marsden and the naturalist Johann Reinhold Forster.

Johann Friedrich Blumenbach added Austronesians as the fifth category to his "varieties" of humans in the second edition of De Generis Humani Varietate Nativa (1781). He initially grouped them by geography and thus called Austronesians the "people from the southern world". In the third edition, published in 1795, he named Austronesians the "Malay race", or the "brown race", after correspondence with Joseph Banks, who was part of the first voyage of James Cook. Blumenbach used the term "Malay" due to his belief that most Austronesians spoke the "Malay idiom" (i.e., the Austronesian languages), though he inadvertently caused the later confusion of his racial category with the Malay ethnic group. The other varieties Blumenbach identified were the "Caucasians" (white), "Mongolians" (yellow), "Ethiopians" (black), and "Americans" (red). Blumenbach's definition of the "Malay" race is largely identical to the modern distribution of the Austronesian peoples, including not only Islander Southeast Asians but also the people of Madagascar and the Pacific Islands. Although Blumenbach's work was later used in scientific racism, Blumenbach was a monogenist and did not believe the human "varieties" were inherently inferior to each other. Rather, he believed that the Malay race was a combination of the "Ethiopian" and "Caucasian" varieties.

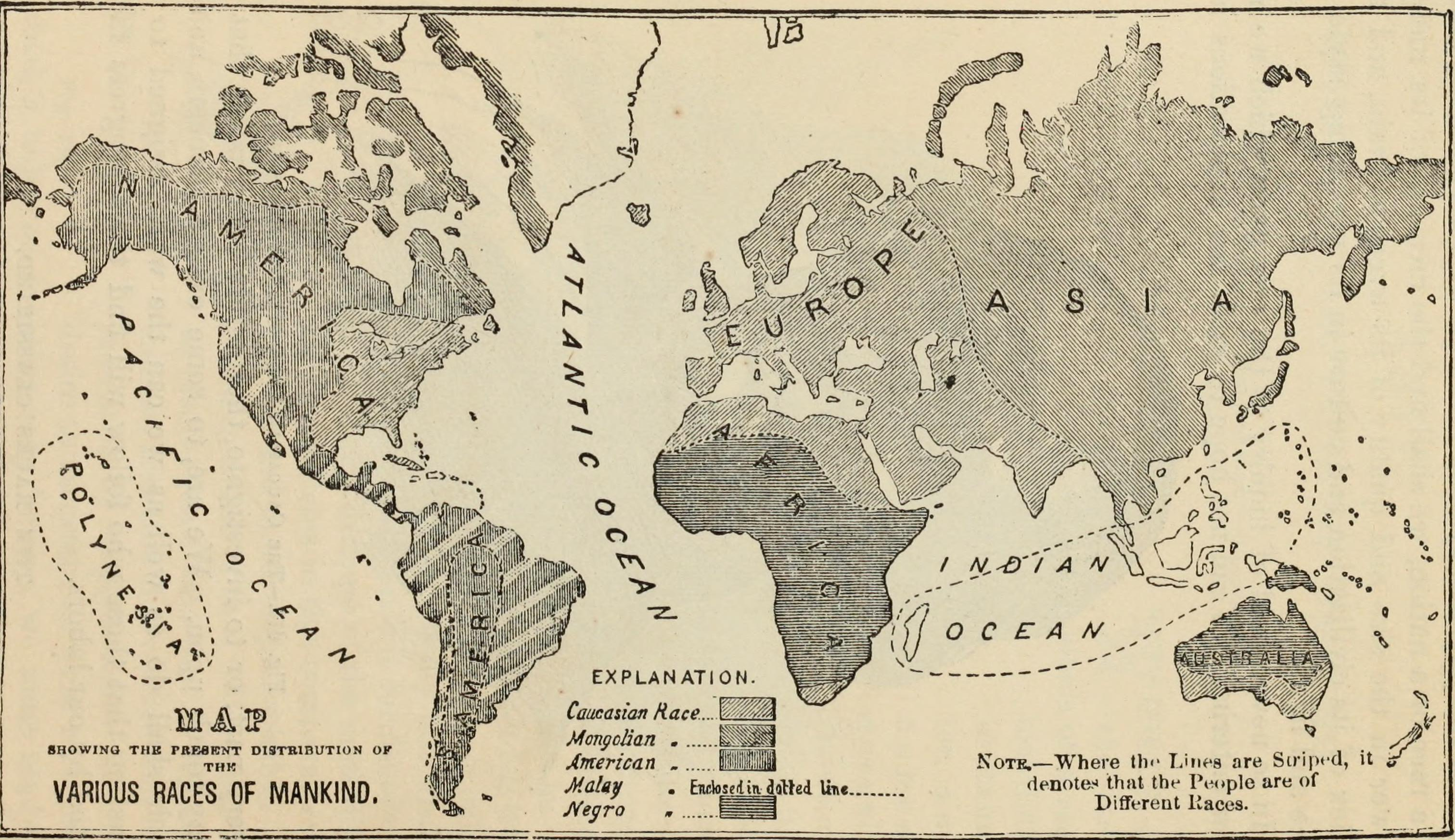
The New Physiognomy map (1889), printed by the Fowler & Wells Company, depicting Johann Friedrich Blumenbach's five human races. The region inhabited by the "Malay race" is shown enclosed in dotted lines. Like in most 19th-century sources, Islander Melanesians are excluded. Taiwan, which was annexed by the Qing dynasty in the 17th century, is also excluded.

Malay variety. Tawny-coloured; hair black, soft, curly, thick and plentiful; head moderately narrowed; forehead slightly swelling; nose full, rather wide, as it were diffuse, end thick; mouth large, upper jaw somewhat prominent with parts of the face when seen in profile, sufficiently prominent and distinct from each other. This last variety includes the islanders of the Pacific Ocean, together with the inhabitants of the Marianas, the Philippine, the Molucca and the Sunda Islands, and of the Malayan peninsula. I wish to call it the Malay, because the majority of the men of this variety, especially those who inhabit the Indian islands close to the Malacca peninsula, as well as the Sandwich, the Society, and the Friendly Islanders, and also the Malambi of Madagascar down to the inhabitants of Easter Island, use the Malay idiom.

— Johann Friedrich Blumenbach, The anthropological treatises of Johann Friedrich Blumenbach, translated by Thomas Bendyshe, 1865.

By the 19th century, however, a classification of Austronesians as being a subset of the "Mongolian" race was favored, as was polygenism. The Australo-Melanesian populations of Southeast Asia and Melanesia (whom Blumenbach initially classified as a "subrace" of the "Malay" race) were also now being treated as a separate "Ethiopian" race by authors like Georges Cuvier, Conrad Malte-Brun (who first coined the term "Oceania" as Océanique), Julien-Joseph Virey, and René Lesson.

The British naturalist James Cowles Prichard originally followed Blumenbach by treating Papuans and Indigenous Australians as being descendants of the same stock as Austronesians. But by his third edition of Researches into the Physical History of Man (1836–1847), his work had become more racialized due to the influence of polygenism. He classified the peoples of Austronesia into two groups: the "Malayo-Polynesians" (roughly equivalent to the Austronesian peoples) and the "Kelænonesians" (roughly equivalent to the Australo-Melanesians). He further subdivided the latter into the "Alfourous" (also "Haraforas" or "Alfoërs", the Native Australians), and the "Pelagian or Oceanic Negroes" (the Melanesians and western Polynesians). Despite this, he acknowledges that "Malayo-Polynesians" and "Pelagian Negroes" had "remarkable characters in common", particularly in terms of language and craniometry.

In linguistics, the Malayo-Polynesian language family also initially excluded Melanesia and Micronesia, due to the perceived physical differences between the inhabitants of these regions from Malayo-Polynesian speakers. However, there was growing evidence of their linguistic relationship to Malayo-Polynesian languages, notably from studies on the Melanesian languages by Georg von der Gabelentz, Robert Henry Codrington, and Sidney Herbert Ray. Codrington coined and used the term "Ocean" language family rather than "Malayo-Polynesian" in 1891, in opposition to the exclusion of Melanesian and Micronesian languages. This was adopted by Ray, who defined the "Oceanic" language family as encompassing the languages of Southeast Asia and Madagascar, Micronesia, Melanesia, and Polynesia.

In 1899, the Austrian linguist and ethnologist Wilhelm Schmidt coined the term "Austronesian" (austronesisch, from Latin auster, "south wind"; and Greek νῆσος, "island") to refer to the language family. Schmidt had the same motivations as Codrington: he proposed the term as a replacement to "Malayo-Polynesian", because he also opposed the implied exclusion of the languages of Melanesia and Micronesia in the latter name. It became the accepted name for the language family, with Oceanic and Malayo-Polynesian languages being retained as names for subgroups.

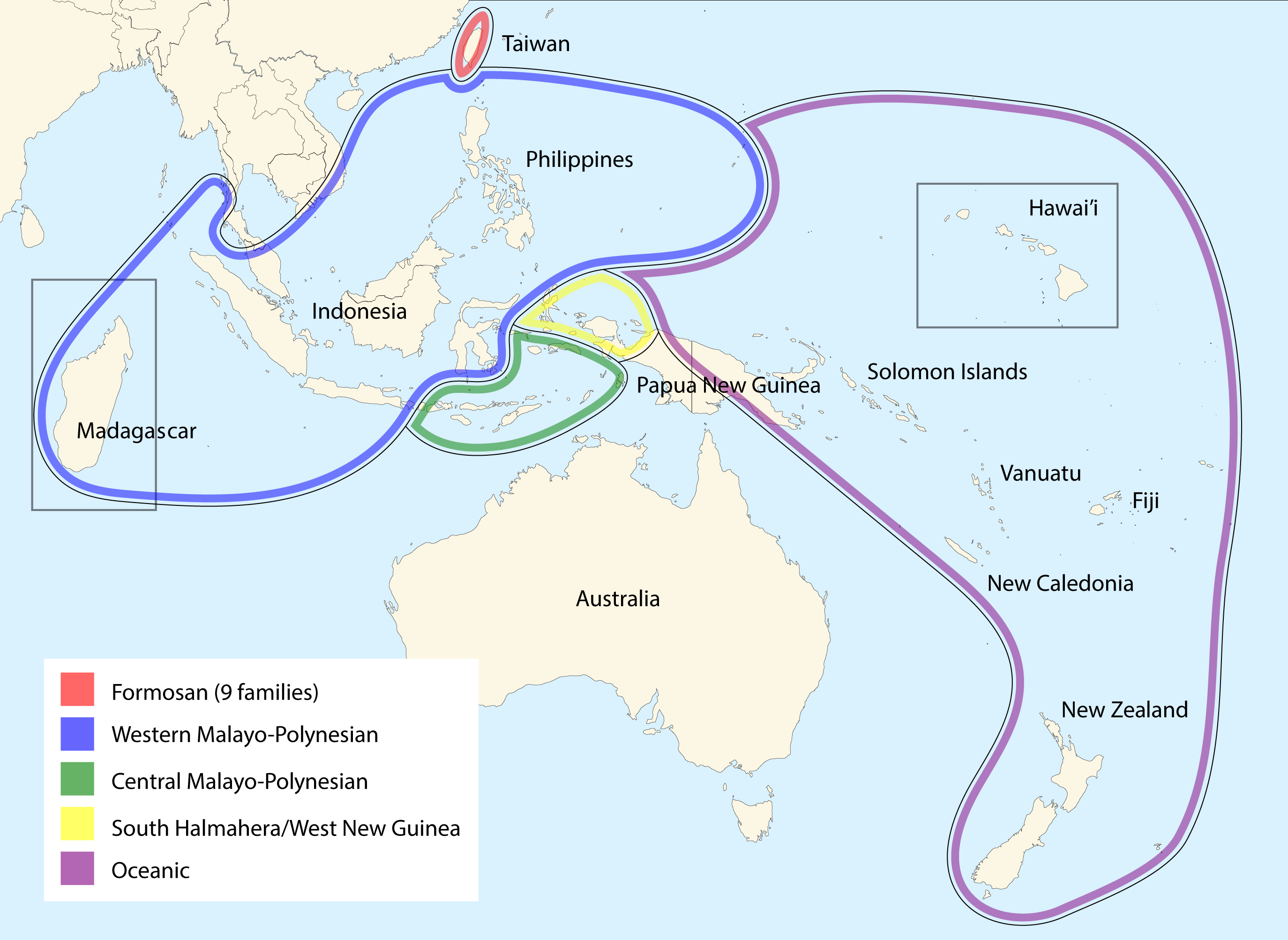
Distribution of the Austronesian languages (Blust, 1999)

The term "Austronesian", or more accurately "Austronesian-speaking peoples", came to refer to people who speak the languages of the Austronesian language family. Some authors, however, object to the use of the term to refer to people, as they question whether there really is any biological or cultural shared ancestry between all Austronesian-speaking groups. This is especially true for authors who reject the prevailing "Out of Taiwan" hypothesis and instead offer scenarios where the Austronesian languages spread among preexisting static populations through borrowing or convergence, with little or no population movements.

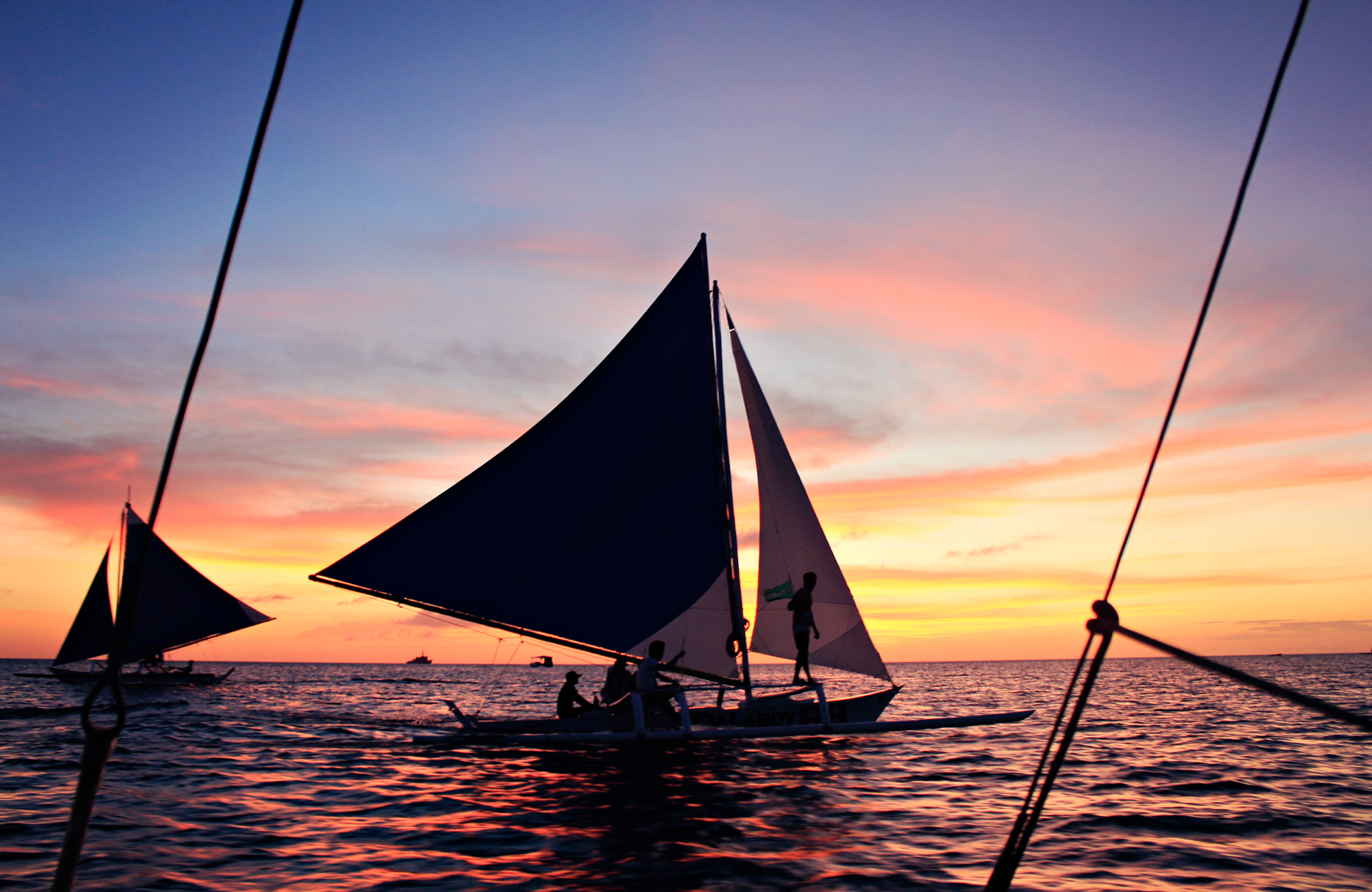
Paraw sailboats from Boracay, Philippines. Outrigger canoes and crab claw sails are hallmarks of the Austronesian maritime culture.

Despite these objections, the general consensus is that the archeological, cultural, genetic, and especially linguistic evidence all separately indicate varying degrees of shared ancestry among Austronesian-speaking peoples that justifies their treatment as a "phylogenetic unit". This has led to the use of the term "Austronesian" in academic literature to refer not only to the Austronesian languages but also the Austronesian-speaking peoples, their societies, and the geographic area of Austronesia.

Some Austronesian-speaking groups are not direct descendants of Austronesians and acquired their languages through language shift, but this is believed to have happened only in a few instances, since the Austronesian expansion was too rapid for language shifts to have occurred fast enough. In parts of Island Melanesia, migrations and paternal admixture from Papuan groups after the Austronesian expansion (estimated to have started at around 500 BCE) also resulted in gradual population turnover. These secondary migrations were incremental and happened gradually enough that the culture and language of these groups remained Austronesian, even though in modern times, they are genetically more Papuan. In the vast majority of cases, the language and material culture of Austronesian-speaking groups descend directly through generational continuity, especially in islands that were previously uninhabited.

Serious research into the Austronesian languages and its speakers has been ongoing since the 19th century. Modern scholarship on Austronesian dispersion models is generally credited to two influential papers in the late 20th century: The Colonization of the Pacific: A Genetic Trail (Hill & Serjeantson, eds., 1989) and The Austronesian Dispersal and the Origin of Languages (Bellwood, 1991). The topic is particularly interesting to scientists for the remarkably unique characteristics of the Austronesian speakers: their extent, diversity, and rapid dispersal.

Regardless, certain disagreements still exist among researchers with regards to chronology, origin, dispersal, adaptations to the island environments, interactions with preexisting populations in areas they settled, and cultural developments over time. The mainstream accepted hypothesis is the "Out of Taiwan" model first proposed by Peter Bellwood. But there are multiple rival models that create a sort of "pseudo-competition" among their supporters due to narrow focus on data from limited geographic areas or disciplines. The most notable of which is the "Out of Sundaland" (or "Out of Island Southeast Asia") model.

== Geographic distribution ==
Austronesians were the first humans with seafaring vessels that could cross large distances on the open ocean; this technology allowed them to colonize a large part of the Indo-Pacific region. Prior to the 16th-century colonial era, the Austronesian language family was the most widespread in the world, spanning half the planet from Easter Island in the eastern Pacific Ocean to Madagascar in the western Indian Ocean.

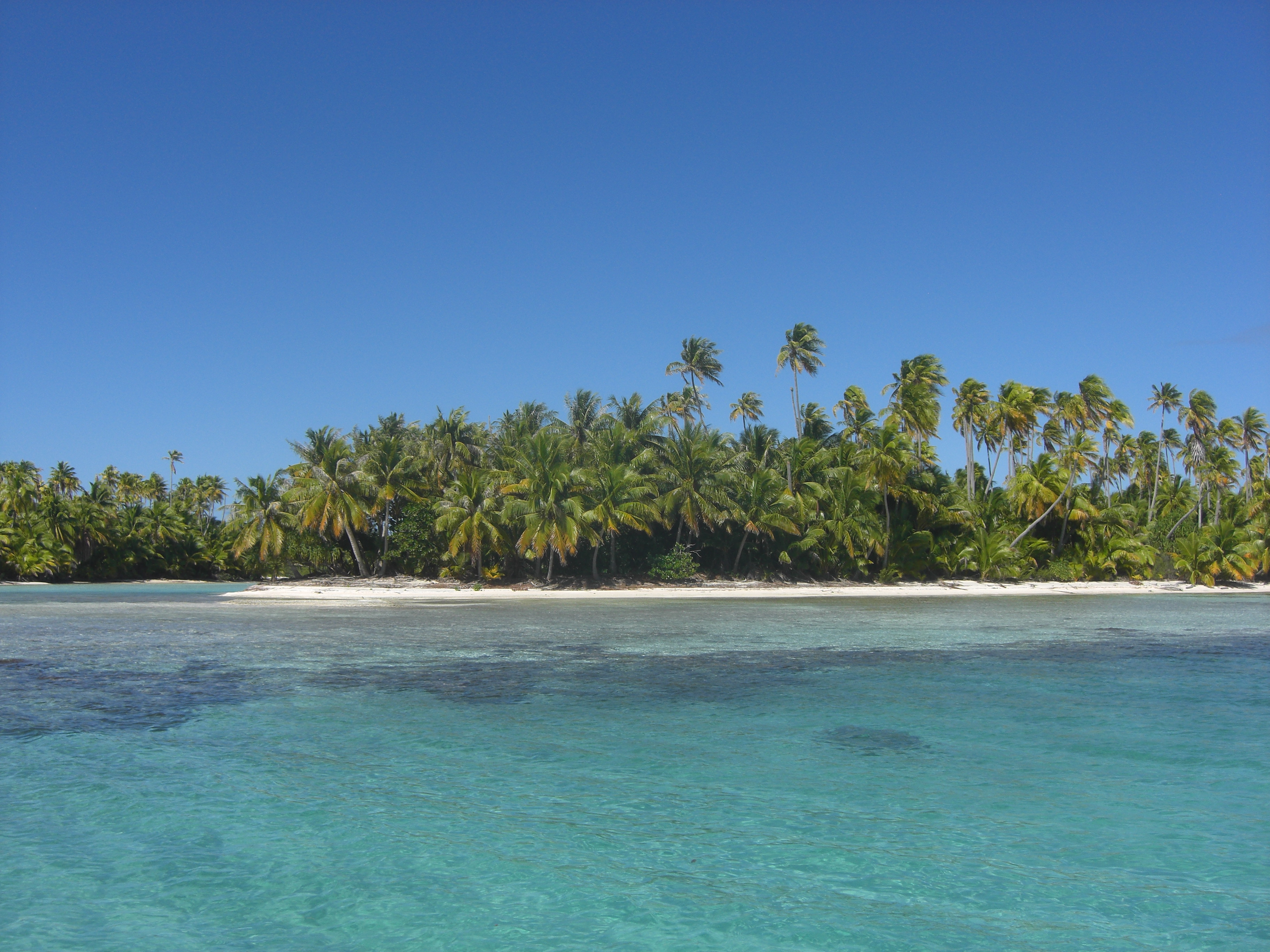
Coconut trees on Rangiroa island in the Tuamotus, French Polynesia; a typical island landscape in Austronesia. Coconuts are native to tropical Asia and were spread as canoe plants to the Pacific Islands and Madagascar by Austronesians.

Languages of the Austronesian family are today spoken by about 386 million people (4.9% of the global population), making it the fifth-largest language family by number of speakers. Major Austronesian languages include Malay (around 250–270 million in Indonesia alone in its own literary standard, named Indonesian), Javanese, and Filipino (Tagalog). The family contains 1,257 languages, the second-largest number of any language family.

The geographic region that encompasses native Austronesian-speaking populations is sometimes referred to as "Austronesia". Other geographic names for various subregions include Malay Peninsula, Greater Sunda Islands, Lesser Sunda Islands, Island Melanesia, Island Southeast Asia, Malay Archipelago, Maritime Southeast Asia, Melanesia, Micronesia, Near Oceania, Oceania, Pacific Islands, Remote Oceania, Polynesia, and Wallacea. In Indonesia, the nationalistic term Nusantara, from Old Javanese, is also popularly used for the Indonesian islands.

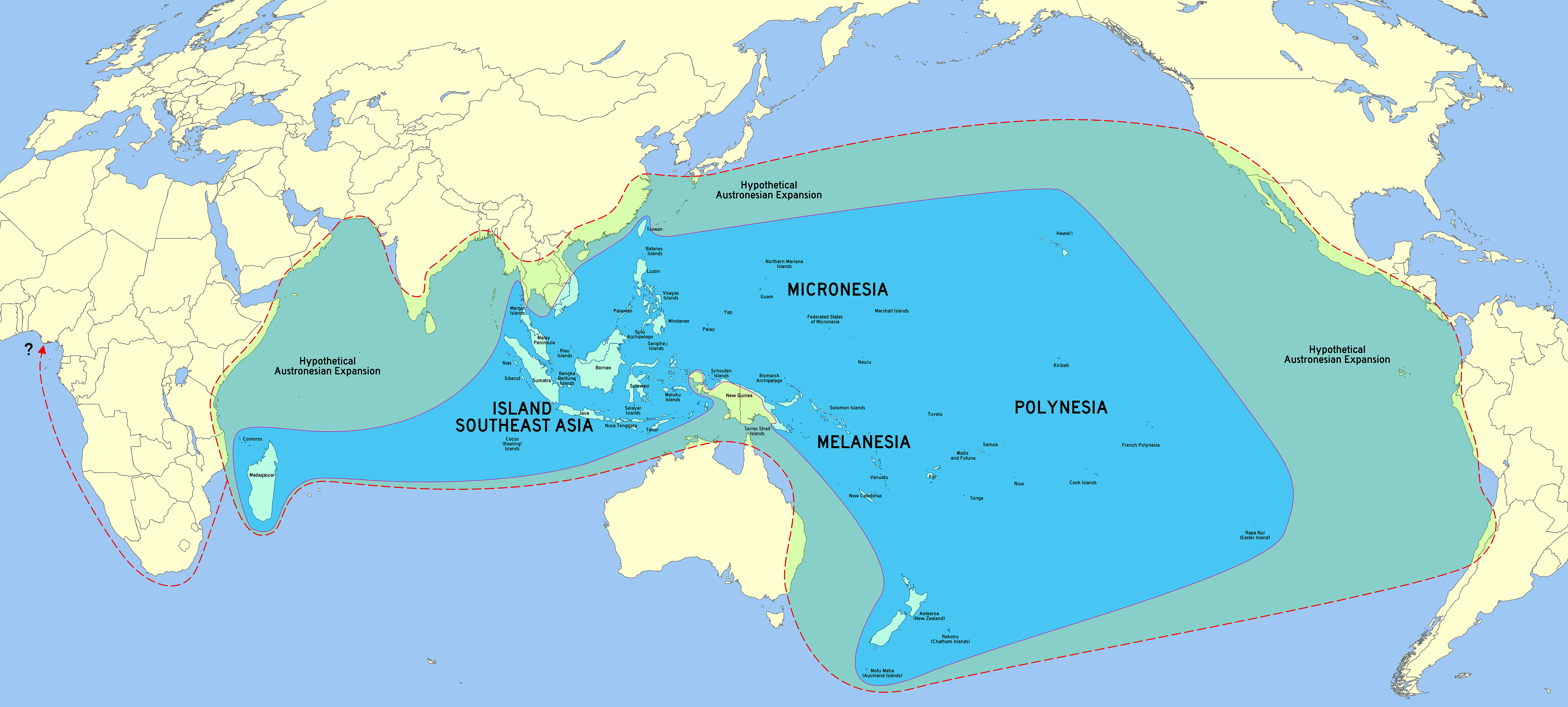
Extent of contemporary Austronesia and possible further migrations and contact (Blench, 2009)

Austronesian regions are almost exclusively islands in the Pacific and Indian oceans, with predominantly tropical or subtropical climates with considerable seasonal rainfall.

Inhabitants of these regions include Taiwanese indigenous peoples, most ethnic groups in Brunei, East Timor, Indonesia, Madagascar, Malaysia, Micronesia, the Philippines, and Polynesia. Also included are the Malays of Singapore; the Polynesians of New Zealand, Hawaii, and Chile; the Torres Strait Islanders of Australia; the non-Papuan peoples of Melanesia and coastal New Guinea; the Shibushi speakers of Mayotte, and the Malagasy and Shibushi speakers of Réunion. Austronesians are also found in the regions of Southern Thailand; the Cham areas in Vietnam, Cambodia, and Hainan; and the Mergui Archipelago of Myanmar.

Additionally, modern-era migration has brought Austronesian-speaking people to the United States, Canada, Australia, the UK, mainland Europe, Cocos (Keeling) Islands, South Africa, Sri Lanka, Suriname, Hong Kong, Macau, and West Asian countries.

Some authors also propose further settlements and contacts in the past in areas that are not inhabited by Austronesian speakers today. These range from likely hypotheses to very controversial claims with minimal evidence. In 2009, Roger Blench compiled an expanded map of Austronesia that encompassed these claims based on a variety of evidence, such as historical accounts, loanwords, introduced plants and animals, genetics, archeological sites, and material culture. They include areas like the Pacific coast of the Americas, Japan, the Yaeyama Islands, the Australian coast, Sri Lanka and coastal South Asia, the Persian Gulf, some Indian Ocean islands, East Africa, South Africa, and West Africa.

=== List of Austronesian peoples ===
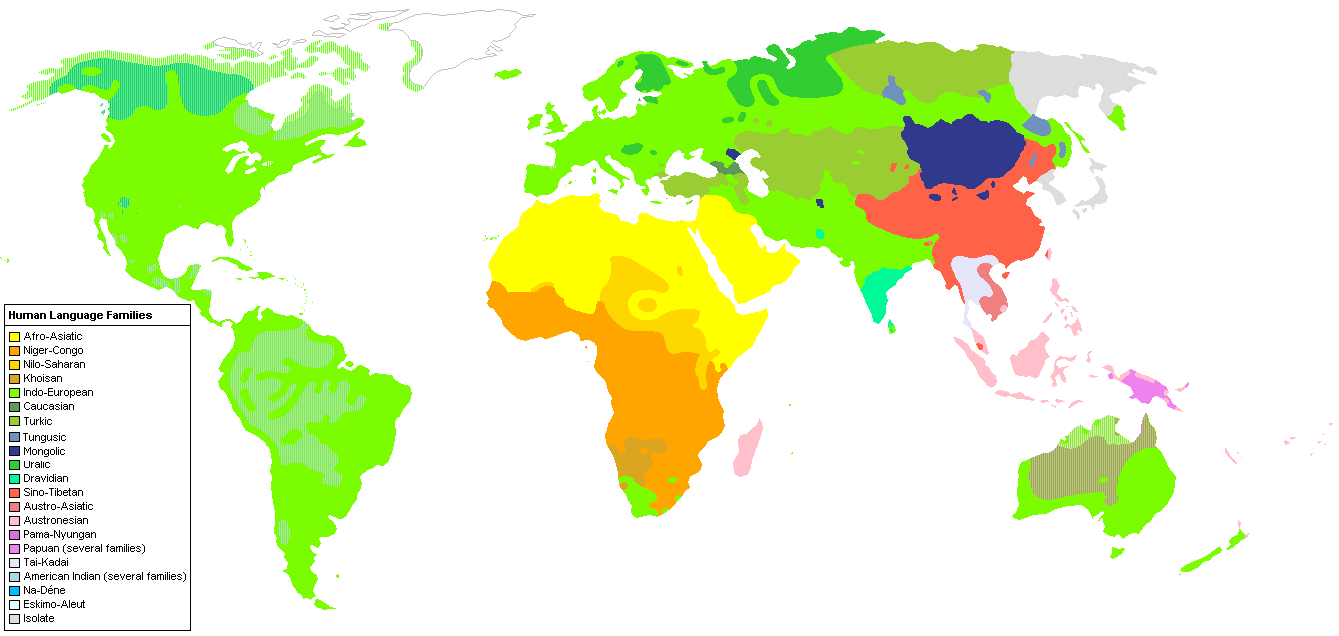
Map showing the distribution of the Austronesian language family (light rose pink). It roughly corresponds to the distribution of all Austronesian peoples.

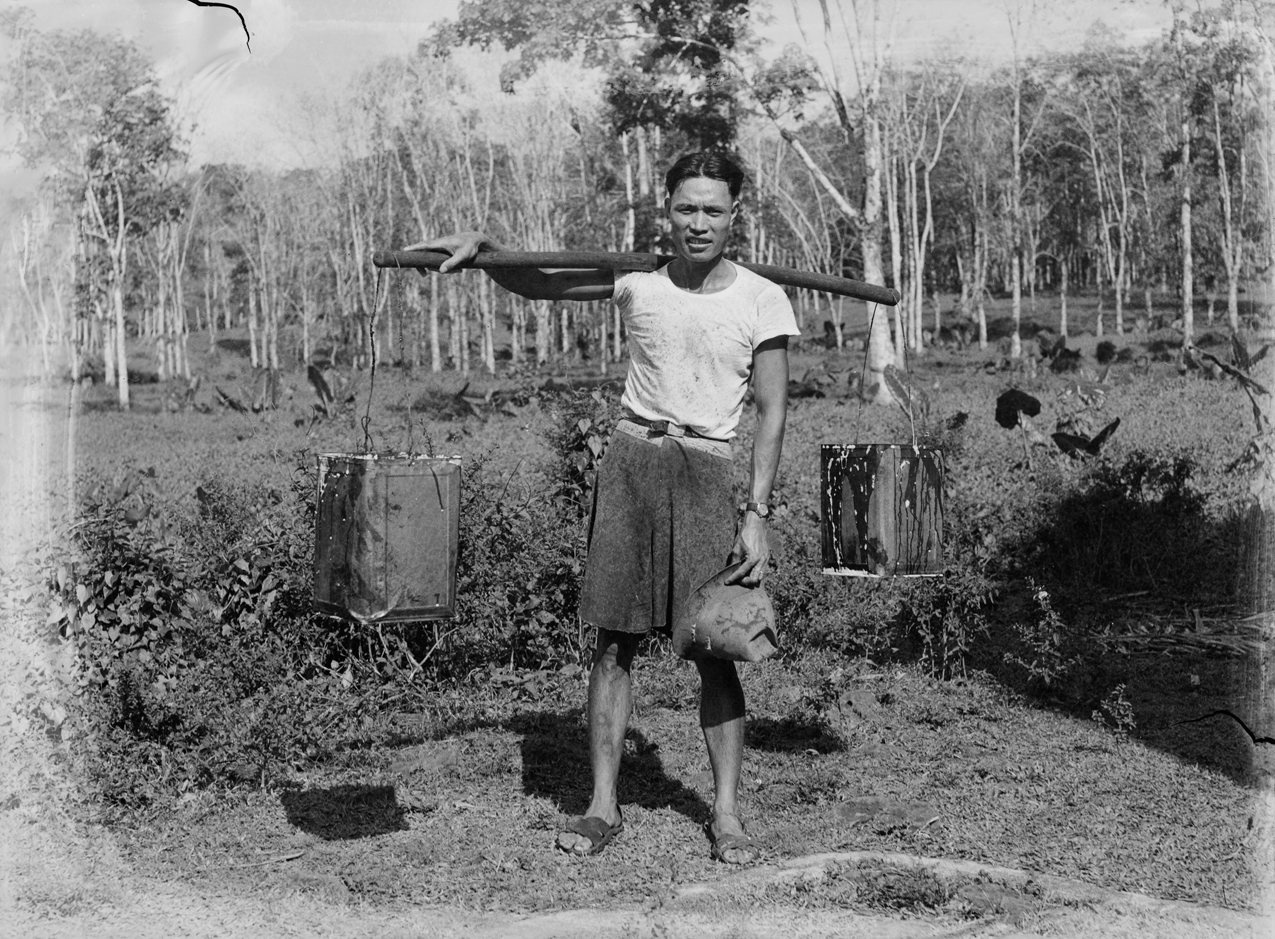
Samoan man carrying two containers over his shoulder

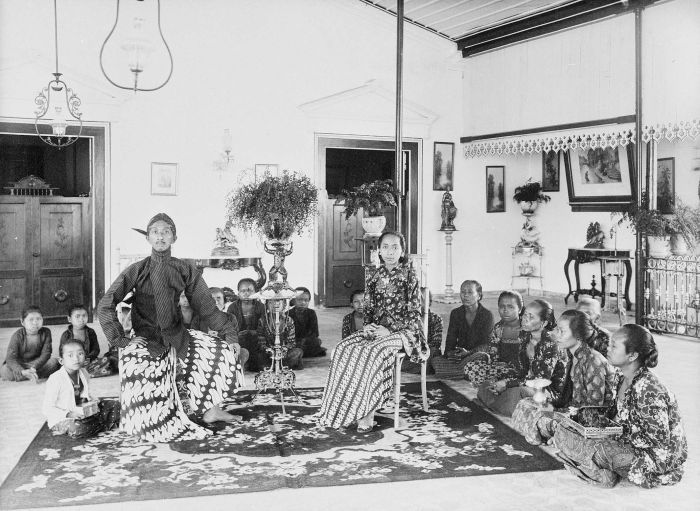
The Javanese people of Indonesia are the largest Austronesian ethnic group.

Austronesian peoples include the following groupings by name and geographic location (incomplete):

- Formosan: Taiwan (e.g., Amis, Atayal, Bunun, Paiwan, collectively known as Taiwanese indigenous peoples)
- Malayo-Polynesian:
  - Borneo groups (e.g., Kadazan-Dusun, Murut, Iban, Bidayuh, Dayak, Lun Bawang/Lundayeh)
  - Chamic group: Cambodia, Hainan, Cham areas of Vietnam (remnants of the Champa kingdom, which covered central and southern Vietnam) as well as Aceh, in northern Sumatra (e.g., Acehnese, Chams, Jarai, Utsuls)
  - Moken
  - Central Luzon group: (e.g., Kapampangan, Sambal)
  - Igorot (Cordillerans): Cordilleras (e.g., Balangao, Ibaloi, Ifugao, Itneg, Kankanaey)
  - Lumad: Mindanao (e.g., Kamayo, Mandaya, Mansaka, Kalagan, Manobo, Tasaday, T'boli)
  - Malagasy: Madagascar (e.g., Betsileo, Merina, Sihanaka, Bezanozano)
  - Melanesians: Melanesia (e.g., Fijians, Kanak, Ni-Vanuatu, Solomon Islands)
  - Micronesians: Micronesia (e.g., Carolinian, Chamorro, Palauans)
  - Moro: Bangsamoro (Mindanao & Sulu Archipelago, e.g., Maguindanao, Iranun, Maranao, Tausug, Yakan, Sama-Bajau)
  - Northern Luzon lowlanders (e.g., Ilocano, Pangasinan, Ibanag, Itawes)
  - Polynesians: Polynesia (e.g., Māori, Native Hawaiians, Cook Islands, Samoans, Tongans)
  - Southern Luzon lowlanders (e.g., Tagalog, Bicolano)
  - Sunda–Sulawesi language and ethnic groups, including Sundanese, Banjar, Javanese, Balinese, Toraja, Minangkabau, Batak, Malay (geographically includes Malaysia, Brunei, Pattani, Singapore, Cocos (Keeling) Islands, parts of Sri Lanka, southern Myanmar, and much of western and central Indonesia)
  - Visayans: Visayas and neighboring islands (e.g., Aklanon, Boholano, Cebuano, Hiligaynon, Masbateño, Waray)

== History ==
=== Prehistory ===
The broad consensus on Austronesian origins is the "two-layer model", where an original Paleolithic indigenous population in Island Southeast Asia were assimilated to varying degrees by incoming migrations of Neolithic Austronesian-speaking peoples from Taiwan and Fujian, in southern China, from around 4,000 BP. Austronesians also mixed with other preexisting populations as well as later migrant populations among the islands they settled, resulting in further genetic input. The most notable are the Austroasiatic-speaking peoples in western Island Southeast Asia (peninsular Malaysia, Sumatra, Borneo, and Java); the Bantu peoples in Madagascar; as well as Japanese, Persian, Indian, Arab, and Han Chinese traders and migrants in more recent centuries.

==== Paleolithic ====
Map of Sunda and Sahul, showing the lowest sea level that occurred when island southeast Asia was first settled by modern humans

Island Southeast Asia was settled by modern humans in the Paleolithic following coastal migration routes, presumably starting before 70,000 BP from Africa, long before the development of Austronesian cultures. These populations are typified by having dark skin, curly hair, and short statures, leading Europeans to believe, in the 19th century, that they were related to African Pygmies. However, despite these physical similarities, genetic studies have shown that they are more closely related to other Eurasian populations than to Africans.

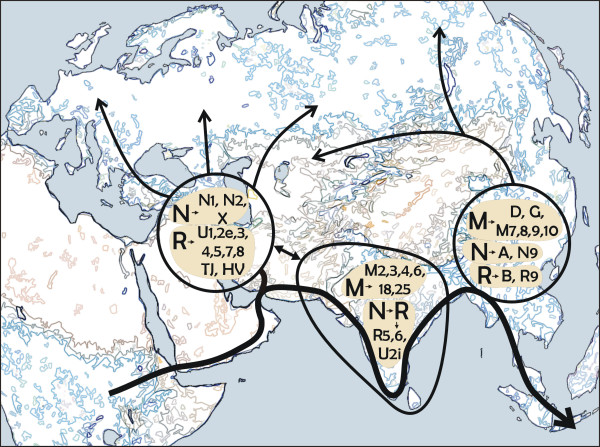
Representation of the coastal migration model, with the indication of the later development of mitochondrial haplogroups.

The lowered sea levels of the Pleistocene made some of the modern-day islands of Sundaland accessible via land bridges. However, the spread of humans across the Wallace line and into Sahul necessitated crossing bodies of water. Remains of stone tools and marine shells in Liang Sarru, Salibabu Island, North Sulawesi, dated to 32,000–35,000 years ago, is possible evidence for the longest sea voyage by Paleolithic humans ever recorded. The island was previously uninhabited by humans or hominins and can only be reached from either Mindanao or the Sangihe Islands by crossing an expanse of water at least 100 km (62 mi) wide, even during the low sea levels of the Pleistocene. Other evidence of early maritime transport are the appearance of obsidian tools with the same source on neighboring islands. These include the Philippine obsidian network (Mindoro and Palawan, ca.33,000–28,000 BP), and the Wallacea obsidian network (Timor, Atauro, Kisar, Alor, ca.22,000 BP). However, the method of crossing remains unknown and could have ranged from simple rafts to dugout canoes by the terminal Pleistocene.

These early settlers are generally historically referred to as "Australo-Melanesians", though the terminology is problematic, as they are genetically diverse, and most groups within Austronesia have significant Austronesian admixture and culture. The unmixed descendants of these groups today include the interior Papuans and Indigenous Australians.

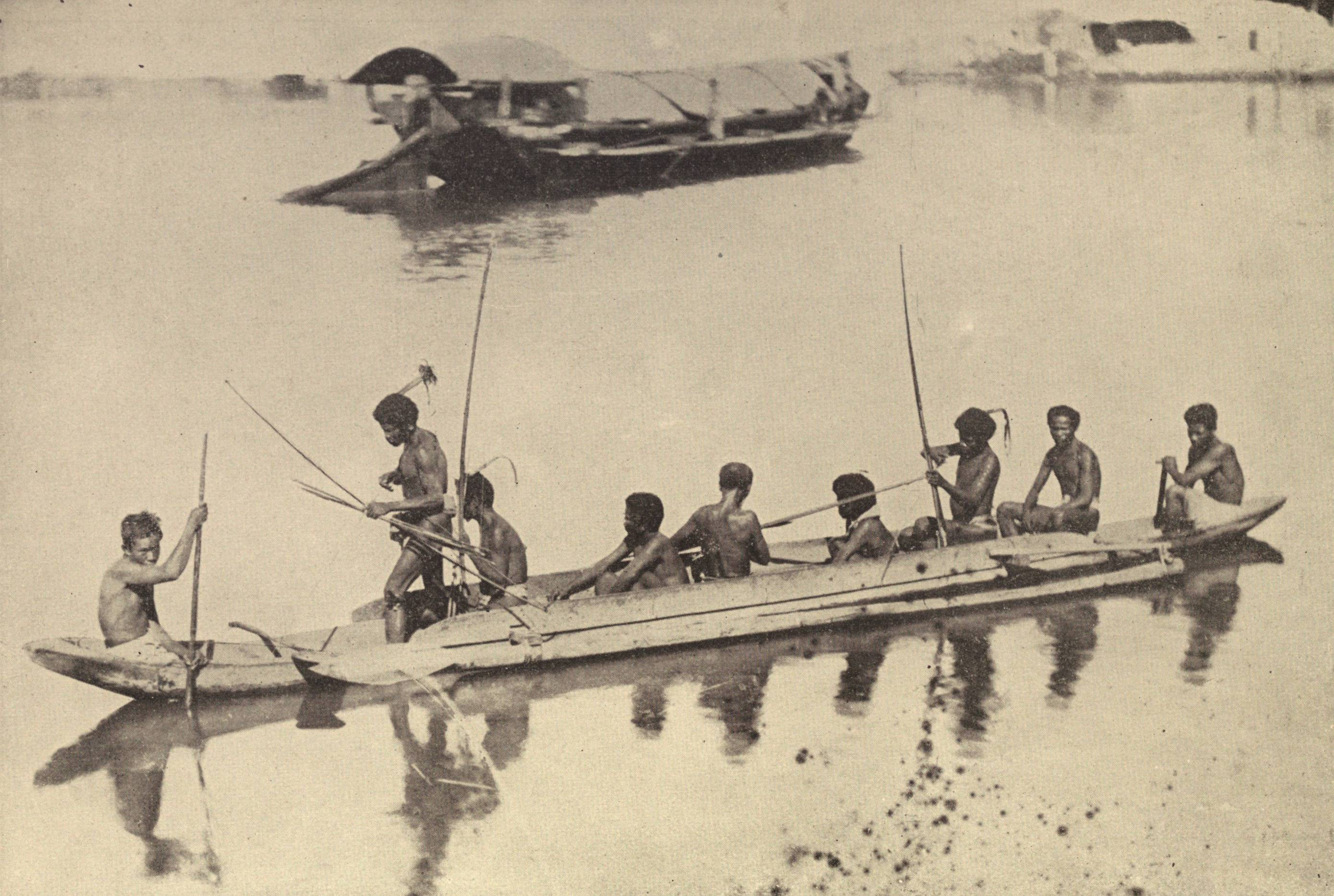
Aeta fishermen in an outrigger canoe in Luzon, Philippines (c. 1899)

In modern literature, descendants of these groups, located in Island Southeast Asia west of Halmahera, are usually collectively referred to as "Negritos", while descendants of these groups east of Halmahera (excluding Indigenous Australians) are referred to as "Papuans". They can also be divided into two broad groups based on Denisovan admixture. Philippine Negritos, Papuans, Melanesians, and Indigenous Australians display Denisovan admixture, while Malaysian and western Indonesian Negritos (Orang Asli) and Andamanese islanders do not. (Note: The absence of Denisovan admixture in western Southeast Asian populations seems to indicate that interbreeding between modern humans and Denisovans happened within Southeast Asia itself, possibly east of the Wallace Line, and not in mainland Eurasia (Reich et al., 2011; Cooper & Stringer, 2013))

Mahdi (2017) also uses the term "Qata" (from Proto-Malayo-Polynesian *qata) to distinguish the indigenous populations of Southeast Asia, versus "Tau" (from Proto-Austronesian *Cau) for the later settlers from Taiwan and mainland China. Both are based on proto-forms for the word "person" in Malayo-Polynesian languages that referred to darker-skinned and lighter-skinned groups, respectively. Jinam et al. (2017) also proposed the term "First Sundaland People" in place of "Negrito", as a more accurate name for the original population of Southeast Asia.

These populations are genetically distinct from later Austronesians, but through fairly extensive population admixture, most modern Austronesians have varying levels of ancestry from these groups. The same is true for some populations historically considered "non-Austronesians", due to physical differences—like Philippine Negritos, Orang Asli, and Austronesian-speaking Melanesians, all of whom have Austronesian admixture. In Polynesians in Remote Oceania, for example, the admixture is around 20 to 30% Papuan and 70 to 80% Austronesian. The Melanesians in Near Oceania are roughly around 20% Austronesian and 80% Papuan, while in the natives of the Lesser Sunda Islands, the admixture is around 50% Austronesian and 50% Papuan. Similarly, in the Philippines, the groups traditionally considered to be "Negrito" vary between 30 and 50% Austronesian.

The high degree of assimilation among Austronesian, Negrito, and Papuan groups indicates that the Austronesian expansion was largely peaceful. Rather than violent displacement, the settlers and the indigenous groups absorbed each other. It is believed that in some cases, like in the Toalean culture of Sulawesi (c. 8,000–1,500 BP), it is even more accurate to say that the densely populated indigenous hunter-gatherer groups absorbed the incoming Austronesian farmers, rather than the other way around. Mahdi (2016) further asserts that Proto-Malayo-Polynesian *tau-mata ("person") (Note: Cognates include Sangir taumata, Molima tomotau, Kola tamata, Fijian tamata, Samoan tangata, and Hawaiian kanaka) is derived from a composite protoform *Cau ma-qata, combining "Tau" and "Qata" and indicative of the mixing of the two ancestral population types in these regions.

==== Neolithic China ====
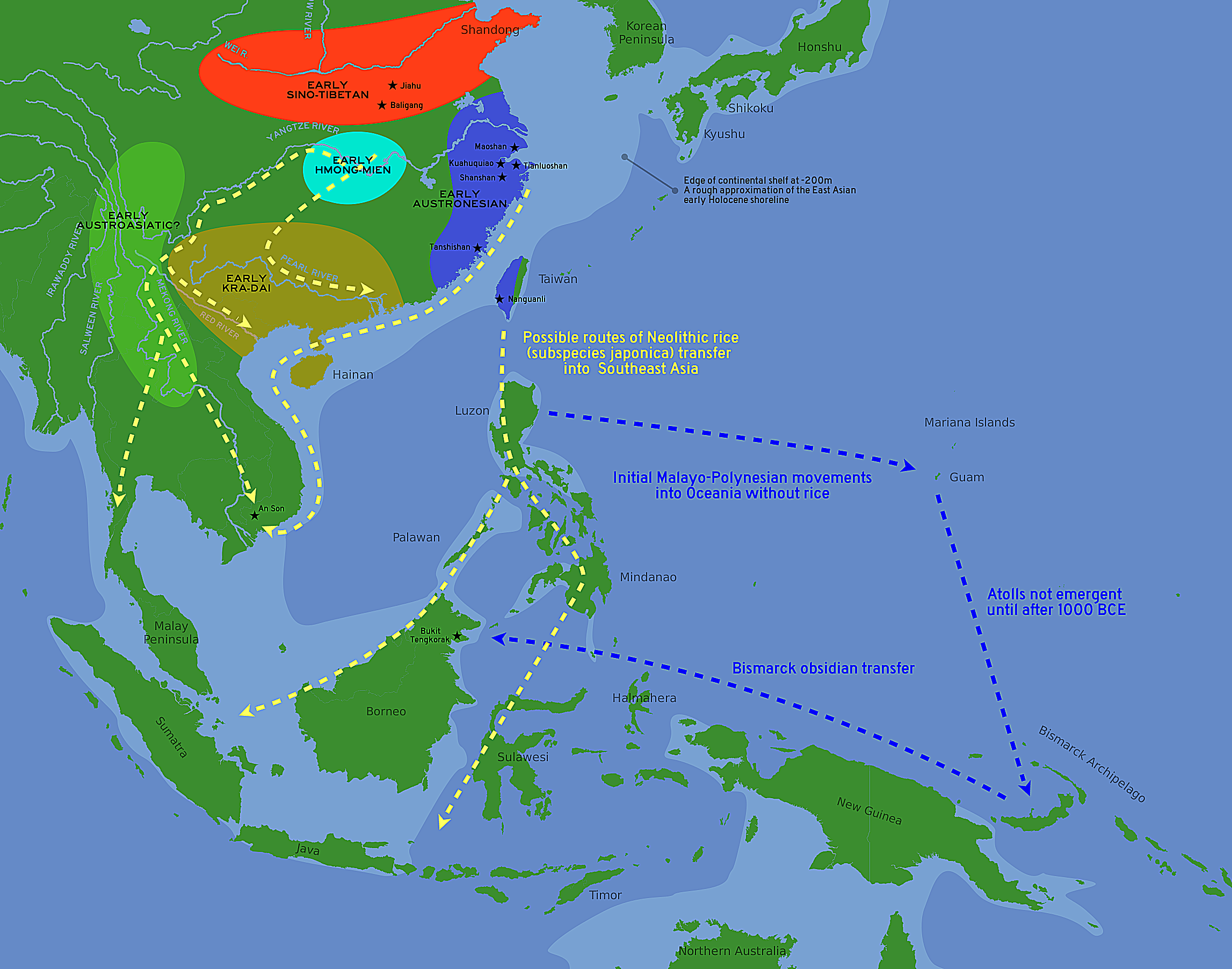
Possible language family homelands and the spread of rice into Southeast Asia (ca. 5,500–2,500 BP). The approximate coastlines during the early Holocene are shown in lighter blue.

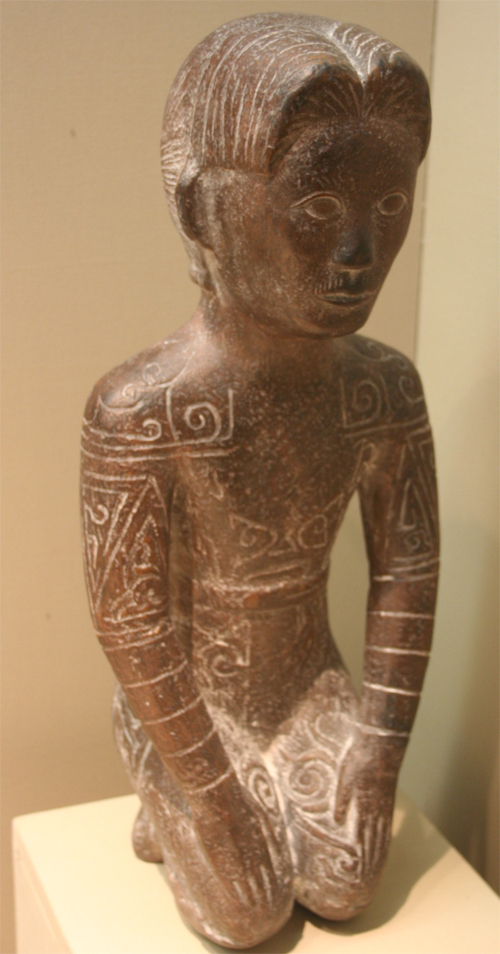
Yue statue of a tattooed Baiyue man in the Zhejiang Provincial Museum (c. 3rd century BCE)

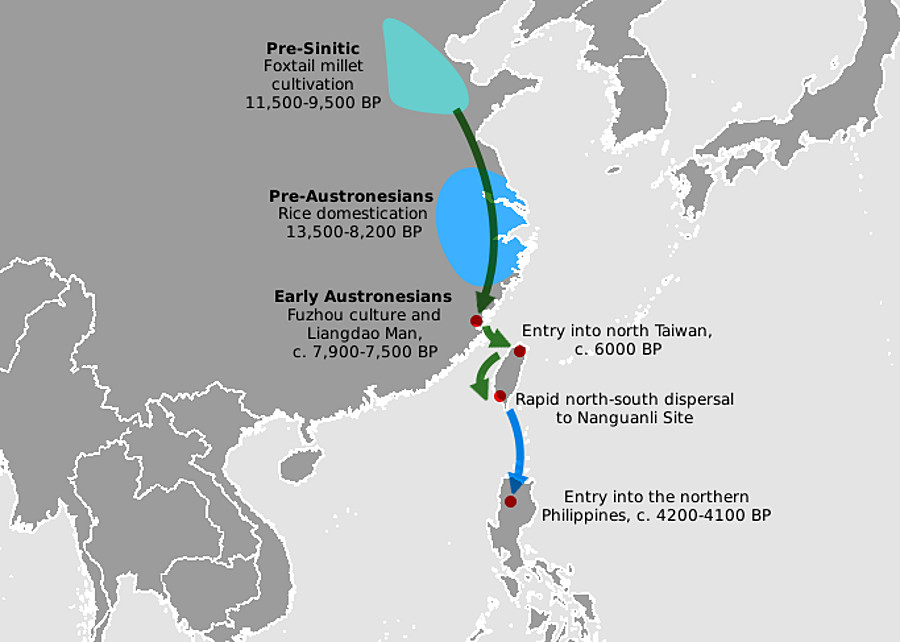
Suggested early migration route of early Austronesians into and out of Taiwan, based on ancient and modern mtDNA data. This hypothesis assumes the Sino-Austronesian grouping, a minority view among linguists. (Ko et al.., 2014)

The broad consensus on the Urheimat (homeland) of Austronesian languages as well as the Neolithic early Austronesian peoples is accepted to be Taiwan, as well as the Penghu Islands. They are believed to have descended from ancestral populations in coastal mainland southern China, which are generally referred to as the "pre‑Austronesians". (Note: Sometimes confusingly also as "early Austronesians" or "proto-Austronesians". The latter should not be confused with the reconstructed Proto-Austronesian language (PAN), which the pre-Austronesians did not speak. (Bellwood, 1988)) Through these pre-Austronesians, Austronesians may also share a common ancestry with neighboring groups in Neolithic southern China.

These Neolithic pre-Austronesians from the coast of southeastern China are believed to have migrated to Taiwan between approximately 10,000 and 6000 BCE. Other research has suggested that, according to radiocarbon dates, Austronesians may have migrated from mainland China to Taiwan as late as 4000 BCE (Dapenkeng culture). They continued to maintain regular contact with the mainland until 1500 BCE.

The identity of the Neolithic pre-Austronesian cultures in China is contentious. Tracing Austronesian prehistory in Fujian and Taiwan has been difficult due to the southward expansion of the Han dynasty (2nd century BCE) and the recent Qing dynasty annexation of Taiwan (1683 CE). Today, the only Austronesian language in southern China is Tsat, spoken in Hainan. The politicization of archaeology is also problematic, particularly erroneous reconstructions among some Chinese archaeologists of non-Sinitic sites as Han. Some authors, favoring the "Out of Sundaland" model, like William Meacham, reject the southern Chinese origin of pre-Austronesians entirely.

Nevertheless, based on linguistic, archaeological, and genetic evidence, Austronesians are most strongly associated with the early farming cultures of the Yangtze River basin that domesticated rice from around 13,500 to 8,200 BP. They display typical Austronesian technological hallmarks, including tooth removal, teeth blackening, jade carving, tattooing, stilt houses, advanced boatbuilding, aquaculture, wetland agriculture, and the domestication of dogs, pigs, and chickens. These include the Kuahuqiao, Hemudu, Majiabang, Songze, Liangzhu, and Dapenkeng cultures that occupied the coastal regions between the Yangtze River delta and the Min River delta.

==== Relations with other groups ====
Based on linguistic evidence, there have been proposals linking Austronesians with other linguistic families into linguistic macrofamilies that are relevant to the identity of the pre-Austronesian populations. The most notable are the connections of Austronesians to the neighboring Austroasiatic, Kra-Dai, and Sinitic peoples (as Austric, Austro-Tai, and Sino-Austronesian, respectively). These are still not widely accepted, as evidence of these relationships are still tenuous, and the methods used are highly contentious.

In support of both the Austric and Austro-Tai hypothesis, Robert Blust connects the lower Yangtze Neolithic Austro-Tai entity with the rice-cultivating Austroasiatic cultures, assuming the center of East Asian rice domestication, and putative Austric homeland, to be located in the Yunnan/Burma border area, instead of the Yangtze River basin, as is currently accepted. Under that view, there was an east–west genetic alignment, resulting from a rice-based population expansion, in the southern part of East Asia: Austroasiatic-Kra-Dai-Austronesian, with unrelated Sino-Tibetan occupying a more northerly tier. Depending on the author, other hypotheses have also included other language families like Hmong–Mien and even Japanese-Ryukyuan into the larger Austric hypothesis.

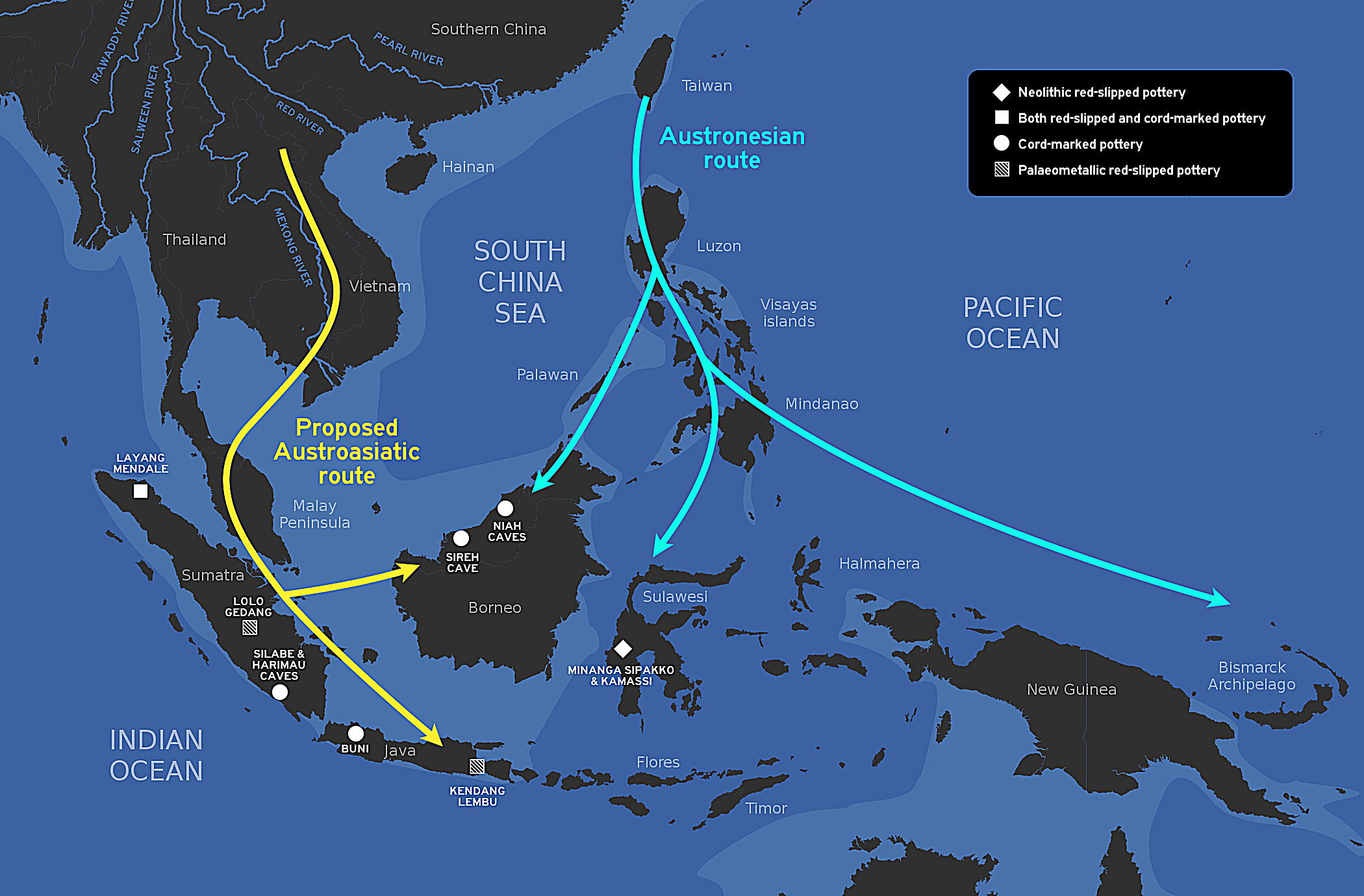
Proposed routes of Austroasiatic and Austronesian migrations into Indonesia (Simanjuntak, 2017)

While the Austric hypothesis remains contentious, there is genetic evidence that at least in western Island Southeast Asia, there had been earlier Neolithic overland migrations (pre-4,000 BP) by Austroasiatic-speaking peoples into what is now the Greater Sunda Islands when the sea levels were lower, in the early Holocene. These peoples were assimilated linguistically and culturally by incoming Austronesian peoples in what is now modern-day Indonesia and Malaysia.

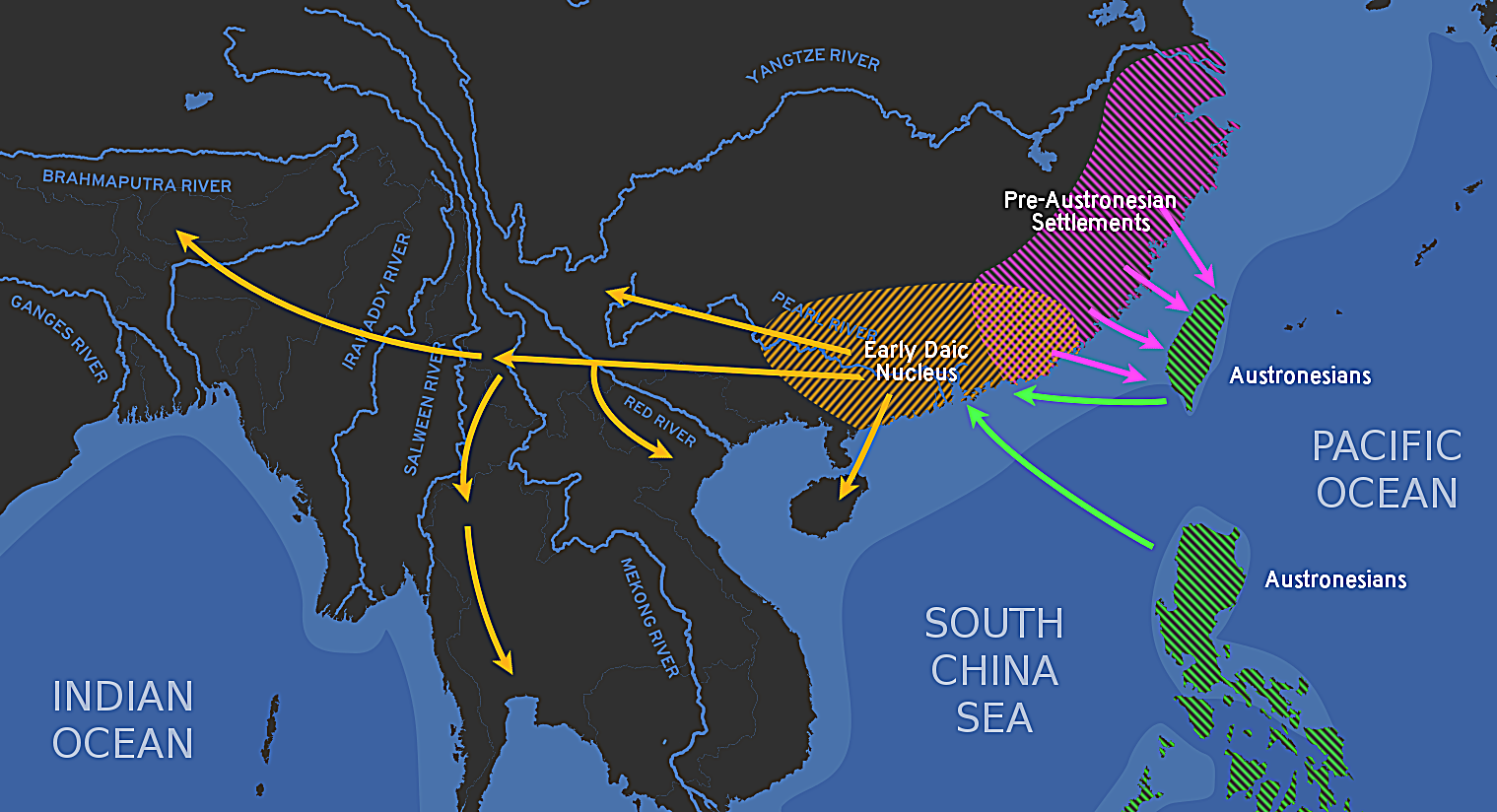
Proposed genesis of Daic languages and their relation with Austronesians (Blench, 2018)

Several authors have also proposed that Kra-Dai speakers may actually be an ancient daughter subgroup of Austronesians that migrated back to the Pearl River Delta from Taiwan and/or Luzon, shortly after the Austronesian expansion, later migrating further westwards to Hainan, Mainland Southeast Asia, and Northeast India. They propose that the distinctiveness of Kra-Dai (it is tonal and monosyllabic) was the result of linguistic restructuring due to contact with Hmong–Mien and Sinitic cultures. Aside from linguistic evidence, Roger Blench has also noted cultural similarities between the two groups, like facial tattooing, tooth removal or ablation, teeth blackening, snake (or dragon) cults, and the multiple-tongued jaw harps shared by the indigenous Taiwanese and Kra-Dai-speakers. However, archaeological evidence for this is still sparse. This is believed to be similar to what happened to the Cham people, who were originally Austronesian settlers (likely from Borneo) to southern Vietnam around 2100–1900 BP and had languages similar to Malay. Their languages underwent several restructuring events to syntax and phonology due to contact with the nearby tonal languages of Mainland Southeast Asia and Hainan. Although the populations of the Malay peninsula, Sumatra, Java, and neighboring islands are Austronesian-speaking, they have significantly high admixture from Mainland Southeast Asian populations. These areas were already populated (most probably by speakers of Austroasiatic languages) before they were reached by the Austronesian expansion, roughly 3,000 years ago. Currently, only the indigenous Aslians still speak Austroasiatic languages. However, some of the languages in the region show signs of underlying Austroasiatic substrates.

According to Juha Janhunen and Ann Kumar, Austronesians may have also settled parts of southern Japan, especially on the islands of Kyushu and Shikoku, and influenced or created the Japanese hierarchical society. It is suggested that Japanese tribes like the Hayato people, the Kumaso, and the Azumi were of Austronesian origin. Until today, local traditions and festivals show similarities to Malayo-Polynesian culture.

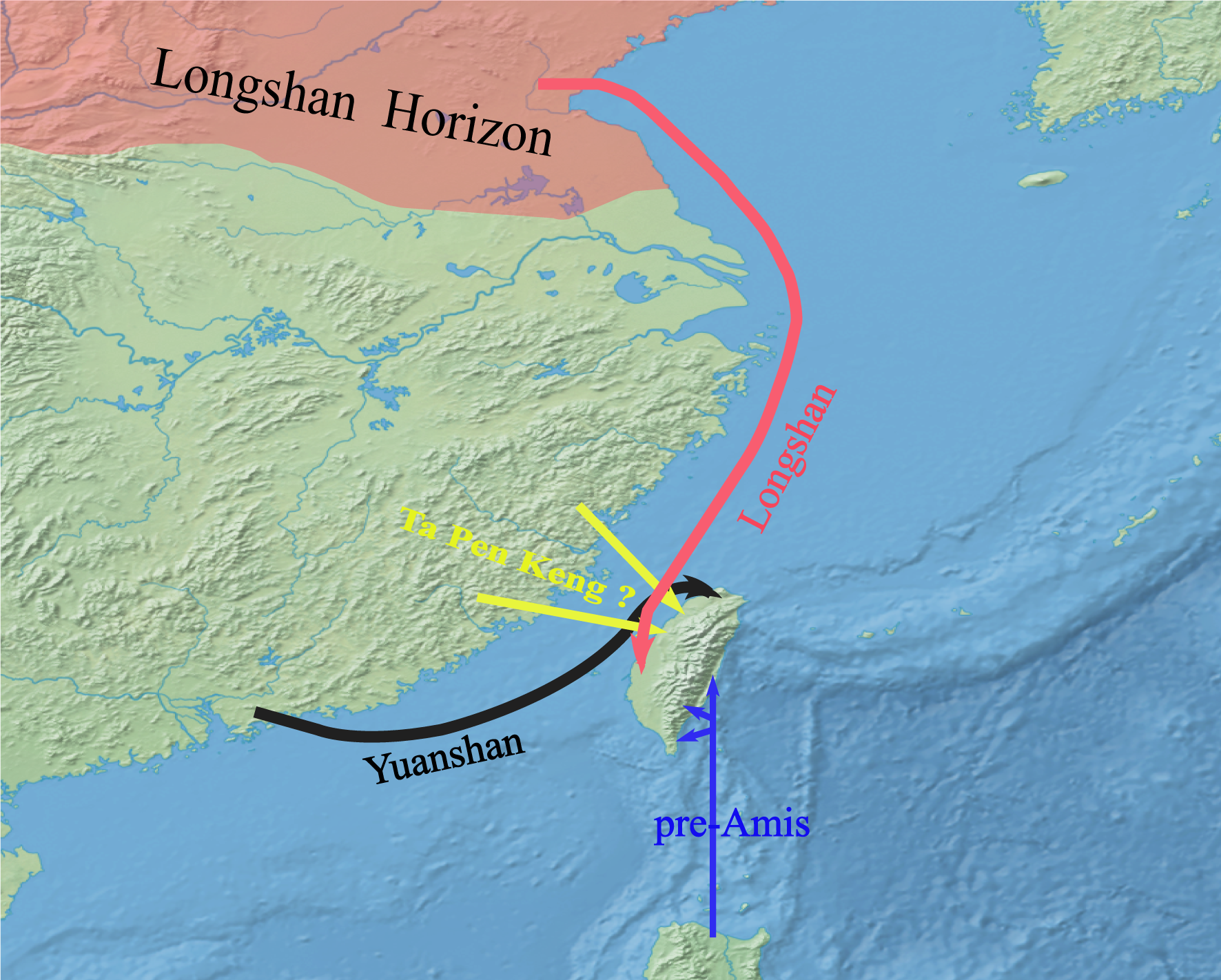
Early waves of migration to Taiwan, proposed by Roger Blench (2014)

The Sino-Austronesian hypothesis, on the other hand, is a relatively new hypothesis by Laurent Sagart, first proposed in 1990. It argues for a north–south linguistic genetic relationship between Chinese and Austronesian. This is based on sound correspondences in basic vocabulary and morphological parallels. Sagart places special significance in shared vocabulary on cereal crops, citing them as evidence of shared linguistic origin. However, this has largely been rejected by other linguists. The sound correspondences between Old Chinese and Proto-Austronesian can also be explained as a result of the Longshan interaction sphere, when pre-Austronesians from the Yangtze region came into regular contact with Proto-Sinitic speakers in the Shandong Peninsula, around the 4th to 3rd millennia BCE. This corresponded with the widespread introduction of rice cultivation to Proto-Sinitic speakers and conversely, millet cultivation to Pre-Austronesians. An Austronesian substratum in formerly Austronesian territories that have been Sinicized after the Iron Age Han expansion is also another explanation for the correspondences that do not require a genetic relationship.

In relation to Sino-Austronesian models and the Longshan interaction sphere, Roger Blench (2014) suggests that the single migration model for the spread of the Neolithic into Taiwan is problematic, pointing out the genetic and linguistic inconsistencies between different Taiwanese Austronesian groups. The surviving Austronesian populations in Taiwan should rather be considered as the result of various Neolithic migration waves from the mainland and back-migration from the Philippines. These incoming migrants almost certainly spoke languages related to Austronesian or pre-Austronesian, although their phonology and grammar would have been quite diverse.

Blench considers the Austronesians in Taiwan to have been a melting pot of immigrants from various parts of the coast of East China that had been migrating to Taiwan by 4000 BP. These immigrants included people from the foxtail millet-cultivating Longshan culture of Shandong (with Longshan-type cultures found in southern Taiwan), the fishing-based Dapenkeng culture of coastal Fujian, and the Yuanshan culture of northernmost Taiwan, which Blench suggests may have originated from the coast of Guangdong. Based on geography and cultural vocabulary, Blench believes that the Yuanshan people may have spoken Northeast Formosan languages. Thus, Blench believes that there is in fact no "apical" ancestor of Austronesian in the sense that there was no true single Proto-Austronesian language in Neolithic Taiwan that gave rise to all present-day Formosan Austronesian languages. Instead, multiple migrations of various pre-Austronesian peoples from mainland China speaking languages that were related but distinct came together to form what we now know as Austronesian in Taiwan. Hence, Blench considers the single-migration model into Taiwan by pre-Austronesians to be inconsistent with both the archaeological and linguistic (lexical) evidence.

=== Migration from Taiwan ===
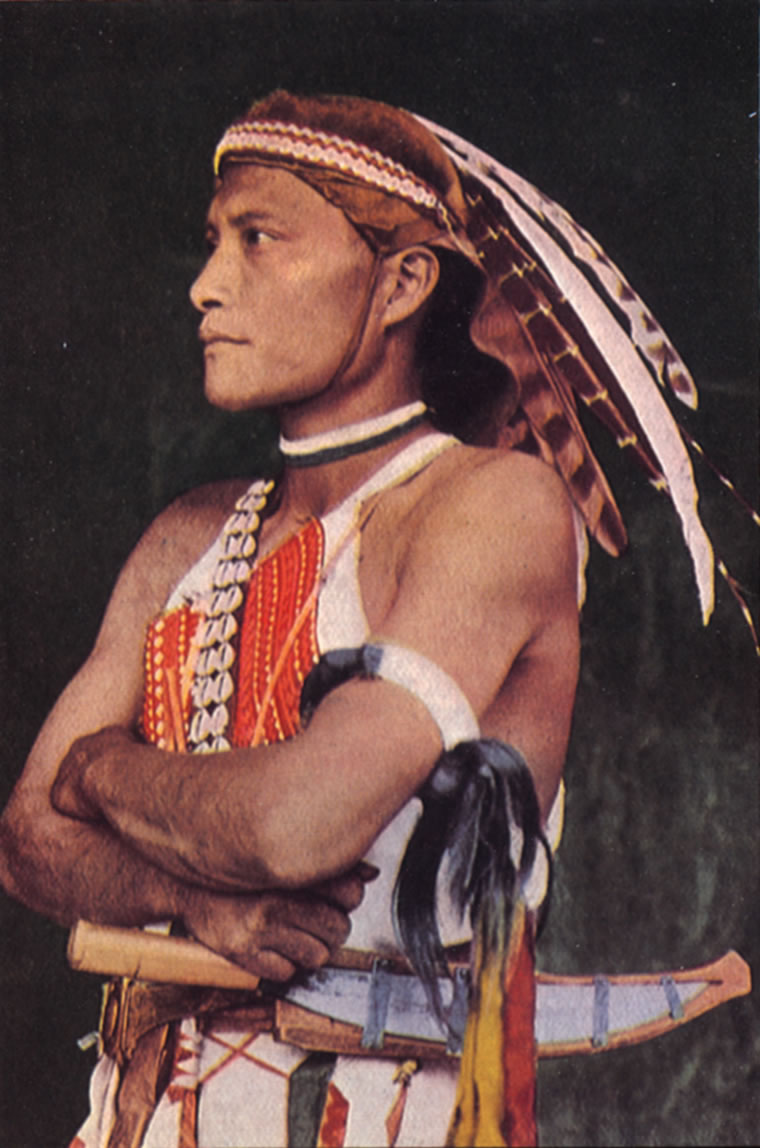
Colorized photograph of a Tsou warrior from Taiwan wearing traditional clothing (pre-World War II)

Map showing the migration of the Austronesians from Taiwan

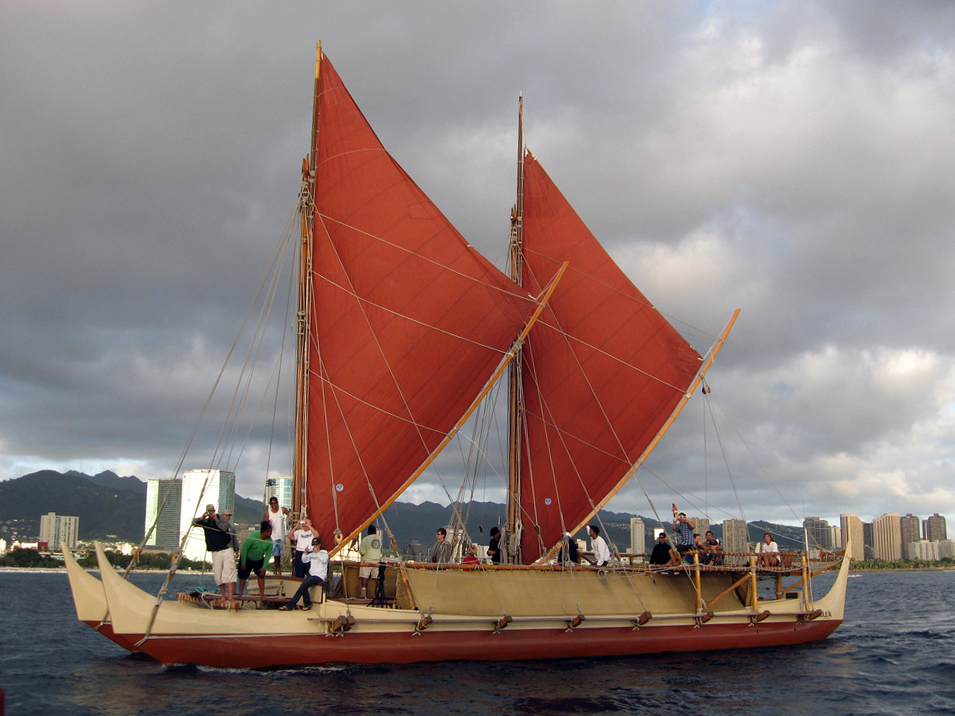
Hōkūleʻa, a modern replica of a Polynesian double-hulled voyaging canoe, is an example of a catamaran, another of the early sailing innovations of Austronesians

The Austronesian expansion (also called the "Out of Taiwan" model) is a large-scale migration of Austronesians from Taiwan, occurring around 3000 to 1500 BCE. Population growth primarily fueled this migration. These first settlers settled in northern Luzon, in the archipelago of the Philippines, intermingling with the earlier Australo-Melanesian population who had inhabited the islands since about 23,000 years earlier. Over the next thousand years, Austronesian peoples migrated southeast to the rest of the Philippines, and into the islands of the Celebes Sea and Borneo. From southwestern Borneo, Austronesians spread further west in a single migration event to both Sumatra and the coastal regions of southern Vietnam, becoming the ancestors of the speakers of the Malayic and Chamic branches of the Austronesian language family. A 2021 study, however, suggests an earlier divergence date between Cordilleran-related groups and populations from mainland East Asia and Taiwan at ~8,000 B.P., coinciding with the Cordilleran settlement of the Philippines.

Soon after reaching the Philippines, Austronesians colonized the Northern Mariana Islands by 1500 BCE or even earlier, becoming the first humans to reach Remote Oceania. The Chamorro migration was also unique in that it was the only Austronesian migration to the Pacific Islands to successfully retain rice cultivation. Palau and Yap were settled by separate voyages by 1000 BCE.

Another important migration branch was by the Lapita culture, which rapidly spread into the islands off the coast of northern New Guinea and into the Solomon Islands and other parts of coastal New Guinea and Island Melanesia by 1200 BCE. They reached the islands of Fiji, Samoa, and Tonga by around 900 to 800 BCE. This remained the furthest extent of the Austronesian expansion into Polynesia until around 700 CE, when there was another surge of island colonization. It reached the Cook Islands, Tahiti, and the Marquesas by 700 CE; Hawaii by 900 CE; Rapa Nui by 1000 CE; and New Zealand by 1200 CE. For a few centuries, the Polynesian islands were connected by bidirectional long-distance sailing, with the exception of Rapa Nui, which had limited further contact due to its isolated geographical location. Island groups like the Pitcairns, the Kermadec Islands, and the Norfolk Islands were also formerly settled by Austronesians but later abandoned. There is also putative evidence, based on the spread of the sweet potato, that Austronesians may have reached South America from Polynesia, where they might have traded with the Indigenous peoples of the Americas.

In the Indian Ocean, Austronesians in Maritime Southeast Asia established trade links with South Asia. They also established early long-distance contacts with Africa, possibly as early as before 500 BCE, based on archaeological evidence like banana phytoliths in Cameroon and Uganda and remains of Neolithic chicken bones in Zanzibar. By the end of the first millennium BCE, Austronesians were already sailing maritime trade routes linking the Han dynasty of China with the western Indian Ocean trade in India, the Roman Empire, and Africa. An Austronesian group, originally from the Makassar Strait region around Kalimantan and Sulawesi, eventually settled Madagascar, either directly from Southeast Asia or from preexisting mixed Austronesian-Bantu populations from East Africa. Estimates for when this occurred vary, from the 5th to 7th centuries CE. It is likely that the Austronesians that settled Madagascar followed a coastal route through South Asia and East Africa, rather than directly across the Indian Ocean. Genetic evidence suggests that some individuals of Austronesian descent reached Africa and the Arabian Peninsula.

==== Alternative views ====
A competing hypothesis to the "Out of Taiwan" model is the "Out of Sundaland" hypothesis, favored by a minority of authors. Notable proponents include William Meacham, Stephen Oppenheimer, and Wilhelm Solheim. For various reasons, they have proposed that the homelands of Austronesians were within Island Southeast Asia (ISEA), particularly in the Sundaland landmass drowned during the end of the Last Glacial Period by rising sea levels. Proponents of these hypotheses point to the ancient origins of mtDNA in Southeast Asian populations, pre-dating the Austronesian expansion, as proof that Austronesians originated from within Island Southeast Asia.

However, these have been repudiated by studies using whole genome sequencing, which have found that all ISEA populations had genes originating from aboriginal Taiwanese. Contrary to the claim of a south-to-north migration in the "Out of Sundaland" hypothesis, the new whole genome analysis strongly confirms the north-to-south dispersal of the Austronesian peoples in the prevailing "Out of Taiwan" hypothesis. Researchers have further pointed out that while humans have been living in Sundaland for at least 40,000 years, the Austronesian people were recent arrivals. The results of the previous studies failed to take into account admixture with the more ancient but unrelated Negrito and Papuan populations.

=== Historical period ===
Queen Liliʻuokalani, the last sovereign monarch of the Kingdom of Hawaii

By the beginning of the first millennium CE, most of the Austronesian inhabitants in Maritime Southeast Asia began trading with India and China. The adoption of the Hindu statecraft model allowed the creation of Indianized kingdoms, such as Tarumanagara, Champa, Butuan, Langkasuka, Melayu, Srivijaya, Mataram, Majapahit, and Bali. Between the 5th and the 15th century, Hinduism and Buddhism were established as the main religion in the region. Muslim traders from the Arabian Peninsula were thought to have brought Islam by the 10th century. This was established as the dominant religion in the Malay archipelago by the 16th century. The Austronesian inhabitants of Near Oceania and Remote Oceania were unaffected by this cultural trade and retained their indigenous culture in the Pacific region.

The Kingdom of Larantuka in Flores, East Nusa Tenggara, was the only Christian (Roman Catholic) indigenous kingdom in Indonesia and in Southeast Asia, with its first king named Lorenzo.

Western Europeans in search of spices and gold later colonized most of the Austronesian-speaking countries of the Asia-Pacific region, beginning in the 16th century, with the Portuguese and Spanish colonization of the Philippines, Palau, Guam, the Mariana Islands, and some parts of Indonesia (present-day East Timor); the Dutch colonization of the Indonesian archipelago; the British colonization of Malaysia and Oceania; the French colonization of French Polynesia; and later, the American governance of the Pacific.

Meanwhile, the British, Germans, French, Americans, and Japanese began establishing spheres of influence within the Pacific islands during the 19th and early 20th centuries. The Japanese later invaded most of Southeast Asia and some parts of the Pacific during World War II. The latter half of the 20th century initiated independence of modern-day Indonesia, Malaysia, East Timor, and many of the Pacific island nations, as well as the re-independence of the Philippines.

== Culture ==
The native culture of Austronesia varies from region to region. The early Austronesian peoples considered the sea as the basic feature of their life. Following their diaspora to Southeast Asia and Oceania, they migrated by boat to other islands. Boats of different sizes and shapes have been found in every Austronesian culture, from Madagascar, Maritime Southeast Asia, to Polynesia, and have different names. In Southeast Asia, head-hunting was restricted to the highlands as a result of warfare. Mummification is only found among the highland Austronesian Filipinos and in some Indonesian groups in Celebes and Borneo.

=== Ships and sailing ===
Seagoing catamaran and outrigger ship technologies were the most important innovations of the Austronesian peoples. They were the first humans with vessels capable of crossing vast distances of water. The crossing from the Philippines to the Mariana Islands at around 1500 BCE, a distance of more than 2,500 km (1,600 mi), is likely the world's first and longest ocean crossing of that time. These maritime technologies enabled them to colonize the Indo-Pacific in prehistoric times. Austronesian groups continue to be the primary users of outrigger canoes today.

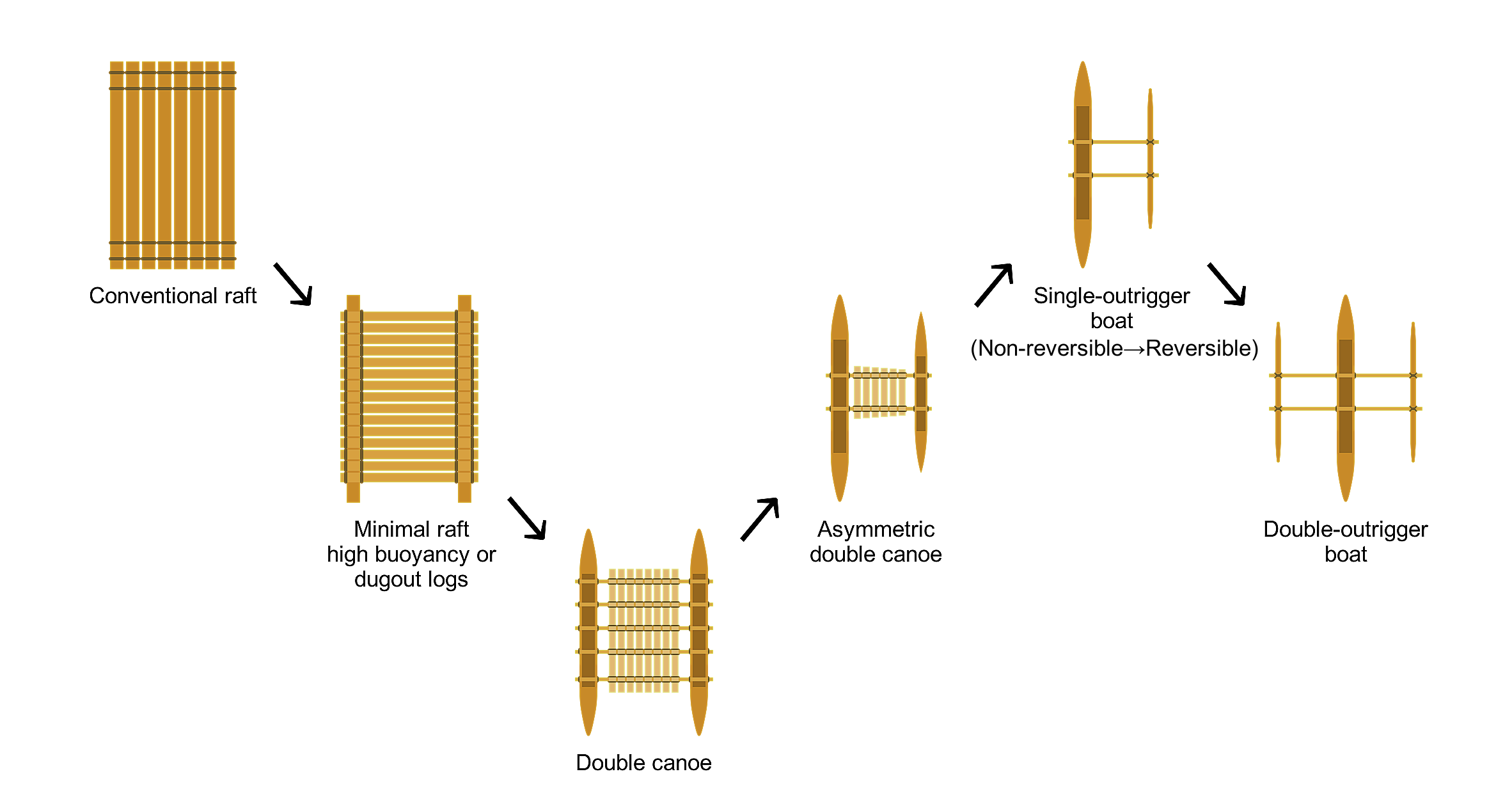
Succession of forms in the development of the Austronesian boat

Early researchers like Heine-Geldern (1932) and Hornell (1943) once believed that catamarans evolved from outrigger canoes, but modern authors specializing in Austronesian cultures, like Doran (1981) and Mahdi (1988), now believe it to be the opposite.

Two canoes bound together developed directly from minimal raft technologies of two logs tied together. Over time, the double-hulled canoe form developed into the asymmetric double canoe, where one hull is smaller than the other. Eventually the smaller hull became the prototype outrigger, giving way to the single outrigger canoe, then to the reversible single outrigger canoe. Finally, the single outrigger types developed into the double outrigger canoe (or trimarans).

This would also explain why older Austronesian populations in Island Southeast Asia tend to favor double outrigger canoes, as it keeps the boats stable when tacking. However, there are small regions where catamarans and single-outrigger canoes are still used. In contrast, more distant outlying descendant populations in Micronesia, Polynesia and Madagascar retained the double-hull and the single-outrigger canoe types, but the technology for double outriggers never reached them (although it exists in western Melanesia). To deal with the problem of the boat's instability when the outrigger faces leeward when tacking, they instead developed the shunting technique in sailing, in conjunction with reversible (Note: The boat is symmetrical front and back, and the prow alternately becomes the stern and vice versa when sailing against the wind) single-outriggers.

The simplest form of all ancestral Austronesian boats had five parts. The bottom consisted of a single piece of hollowed-out log. At the sides were two planks, and two horseshoe-shaped wood pieces formed the prow and stern. These were fitted tightly together edge-to-edge, with dowels inserted into holes in between, and then lashed to each other with ropes (made from rattan or fiber) wrapped around protruding lugs on the planks. This characteristic and ancient Austronesian boatbuilding practice is known as the "lashed-lug" technique. They were commonly caulked with pastes made from various plants as well as tapa bark and fibers that would expand when wet, further tightening joints and making the hull watertight. They formed the shell of the boat, which was then reinforced by horizontal ribs. Shipwrecks of Austronesian ships can be identified from this construction as well as the absence of metal nails. Austronesian ships traditionally had no central rudders but were instead steered using an oar on one side.

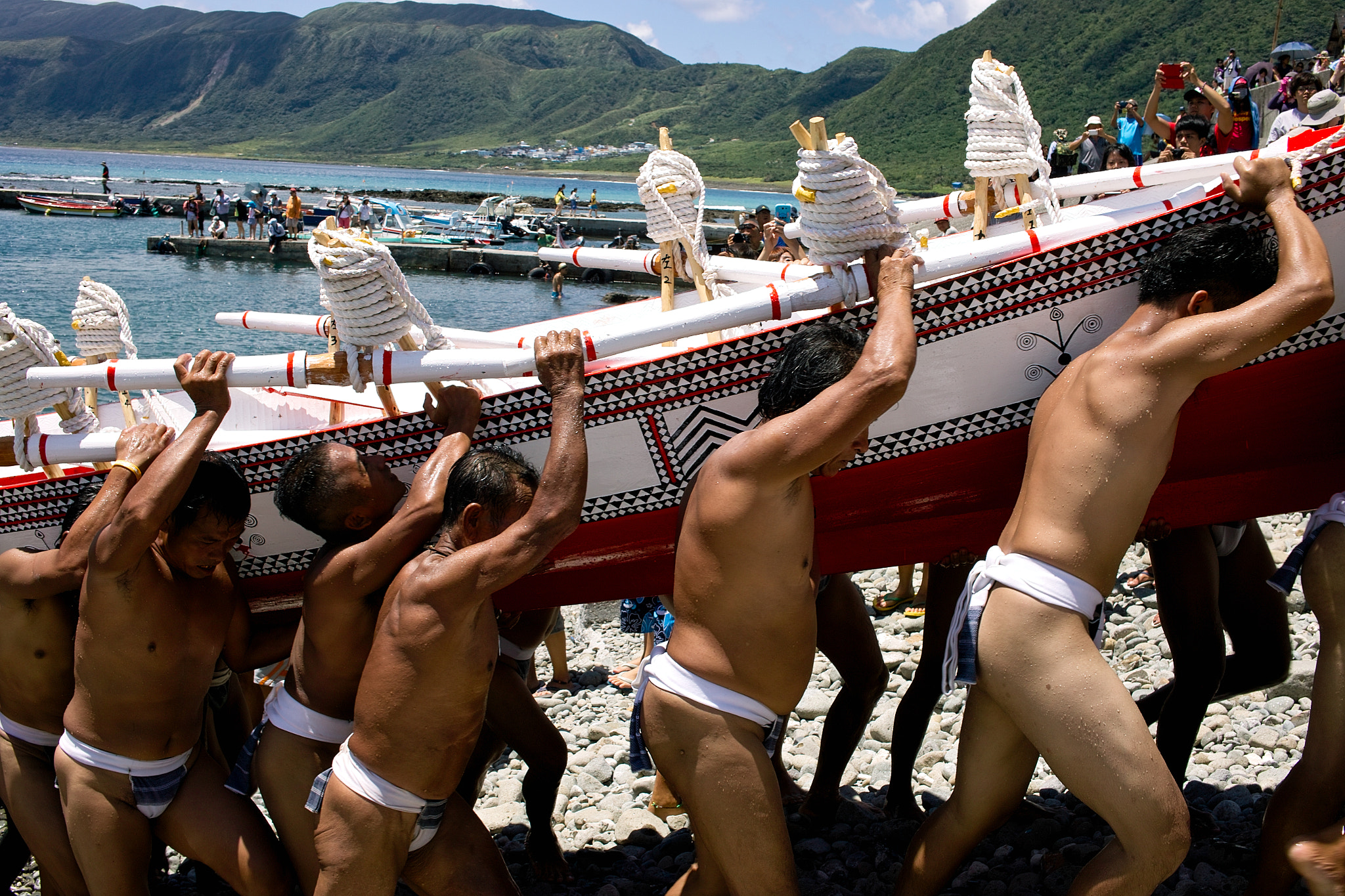
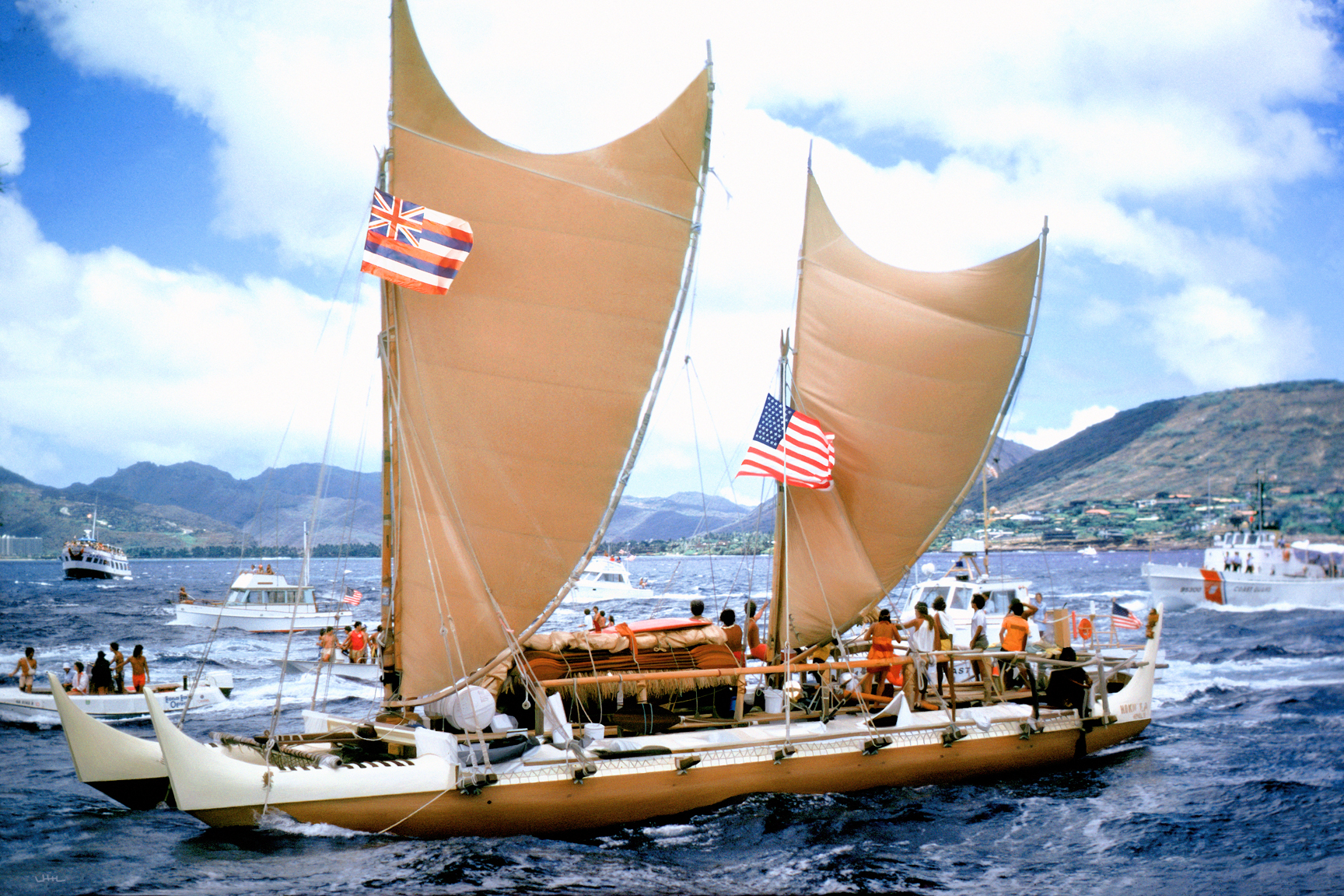
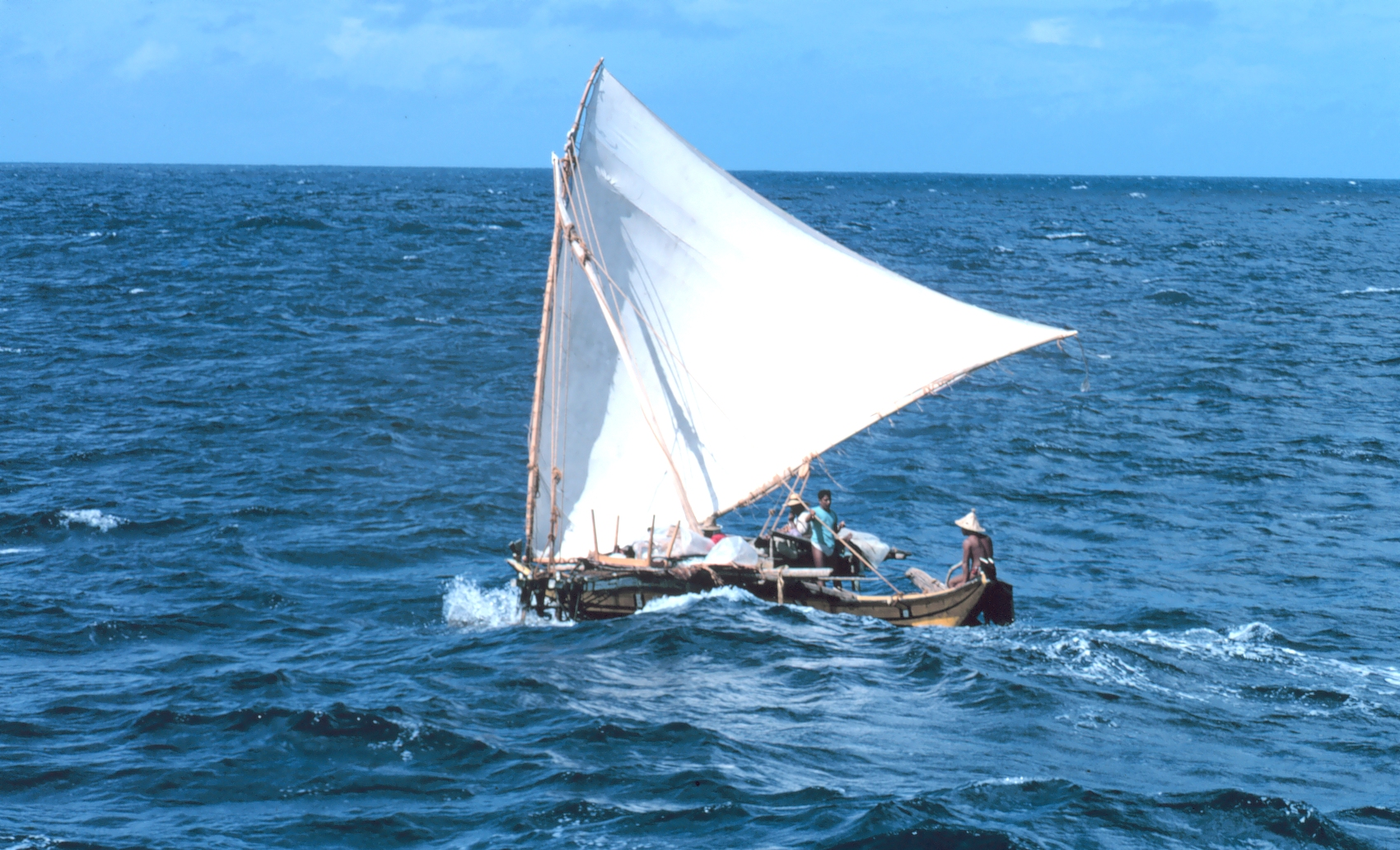
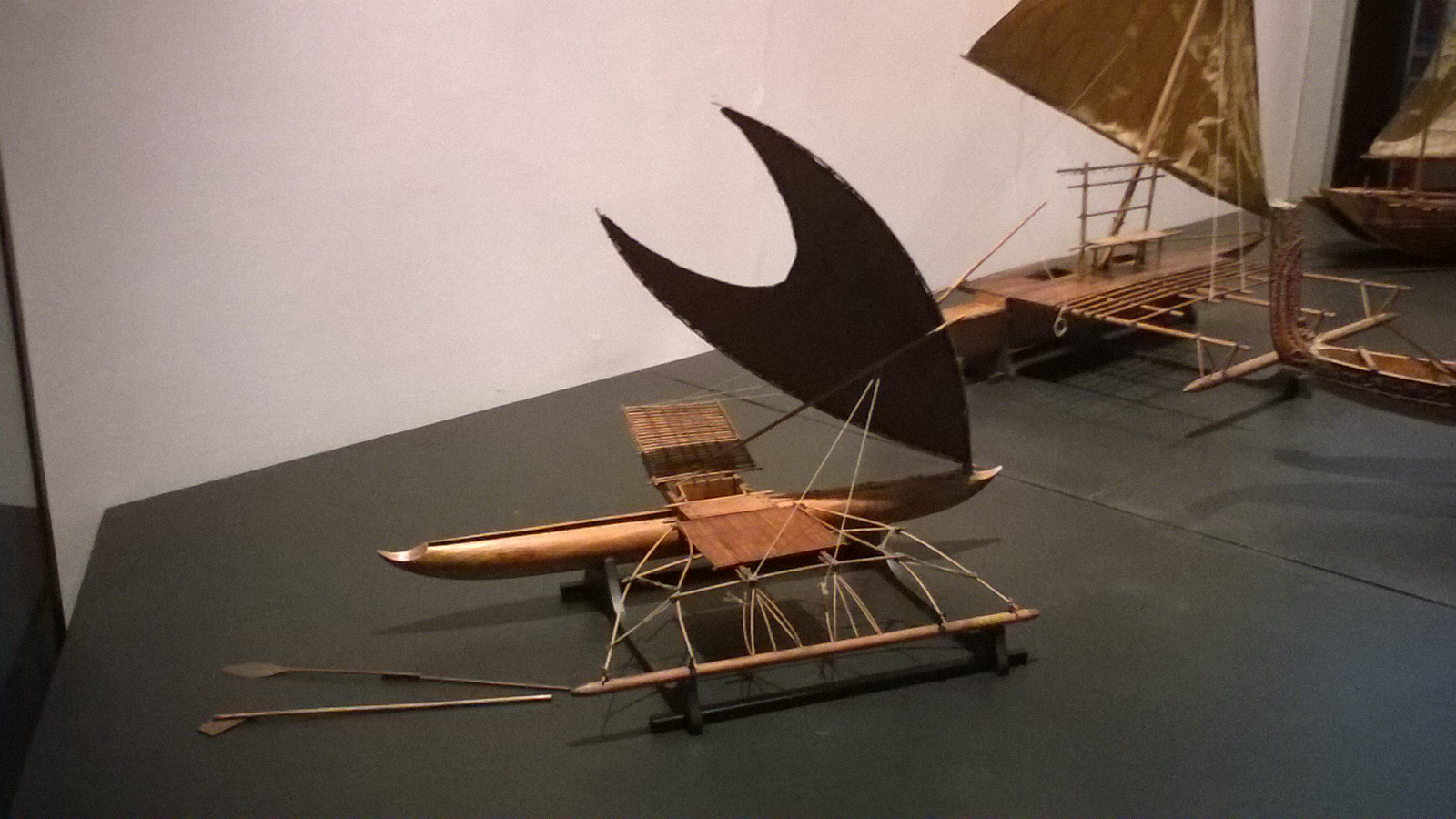
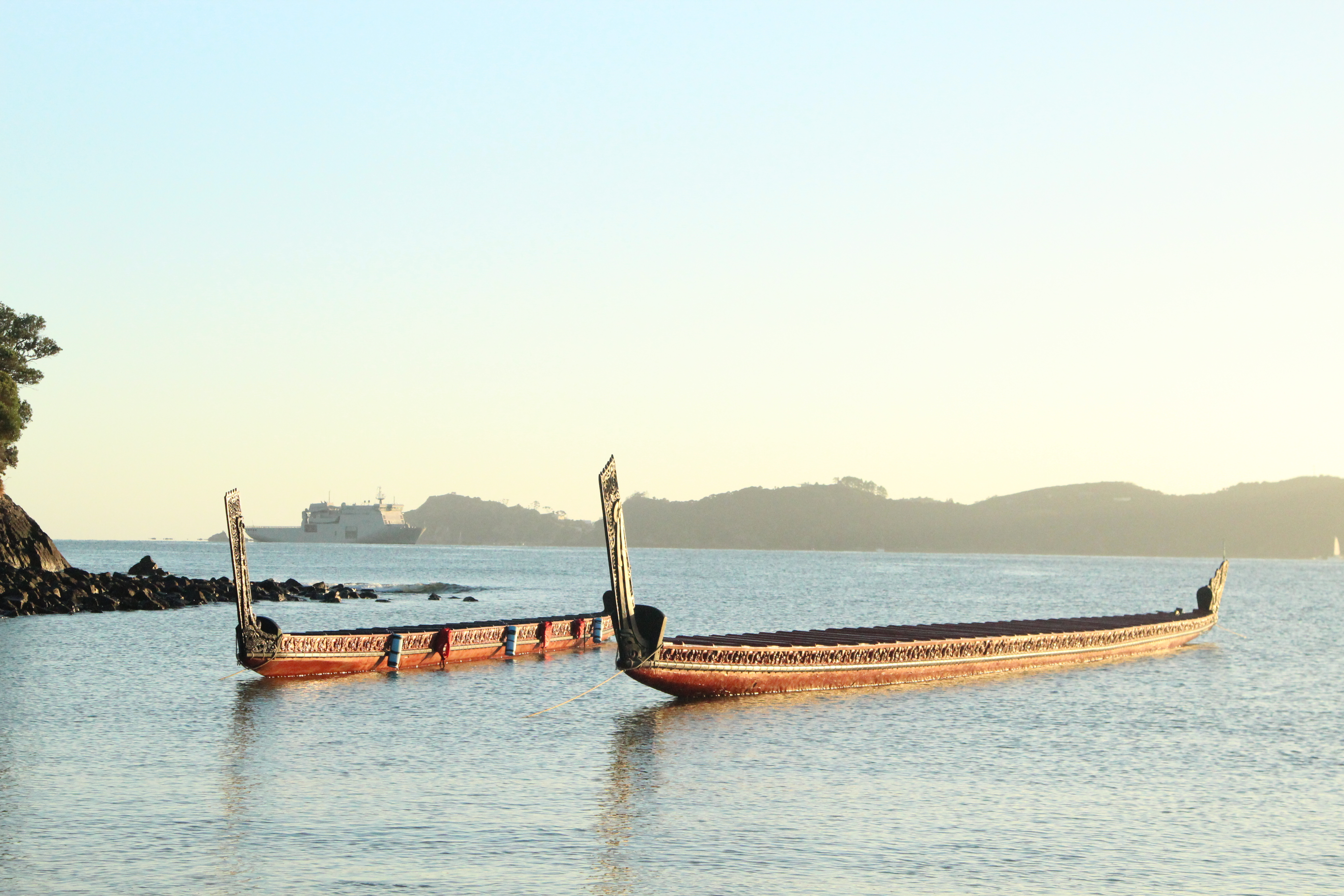
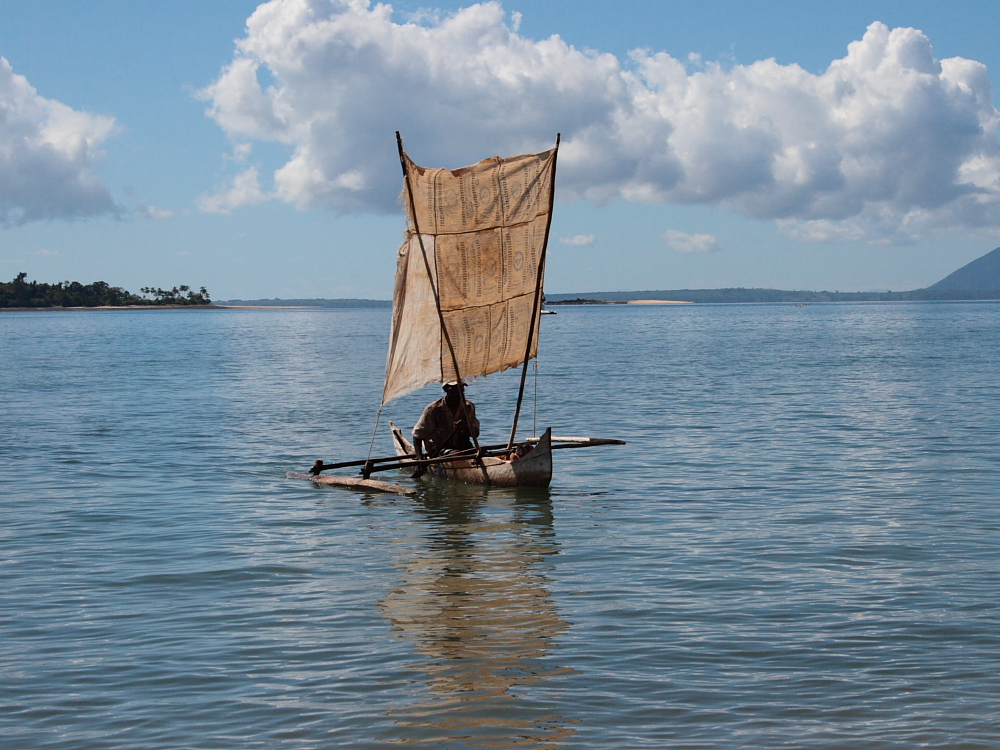
Typical Austronesian ship designs, left to right (also see Austronesian vessels):
- Tao people of Orchid Island carrying their Ipanitika boat
- Hōkūleʻa, a modern replica of a Polynesian voyaging catamaran (wa'a kaulua) with crab claw sails
- A Filipino double-outrigger (trimaran) paraw with a crab claw sail
- A Carolinian single-outrigger wa with a crab claw sail
- A Melanesian single-outrigger tepukei with a forward-mounted crab claw sail, from the Solomon Islands
- A Javanese Borobudur ship with two canted rectangular tanja sails
- Waka, narrow Māori war canoes propelled by paddling
- A Malagasy single-outrigger lakana with a square sail set on a V-shaped arrangement of spars

The ancestral rig was the mastless triangular crab claw sail, which had two booms that could be tilted to the wind. These were built in the double-canoe configuration or had a single outrigger on the windward side. In Island Southeast Asia, these developed into double outriggers on each side, which provided greater stability. The triangular crab claw sails also later developed into square or rectangular tanja sails, which, like crab claw sails, had distinctive booms spanning the upper and lower edges. Fixed masts also developed later in both Southeast Asia (usually as bipod or tripod masts) and Oceania. Austronesians traditionally made their sails from woven mats of the resilient and salt-resistant pandanus leaves. These sails allowed them to embark on long-distance voyaging. In some cases, however, they were one-way voyages. The motives of early Rapa Nui natives and Māori to establish their settlements (Easter Island and New Zealand) are believed to have isolated their settlements from the rest of Polynesia.

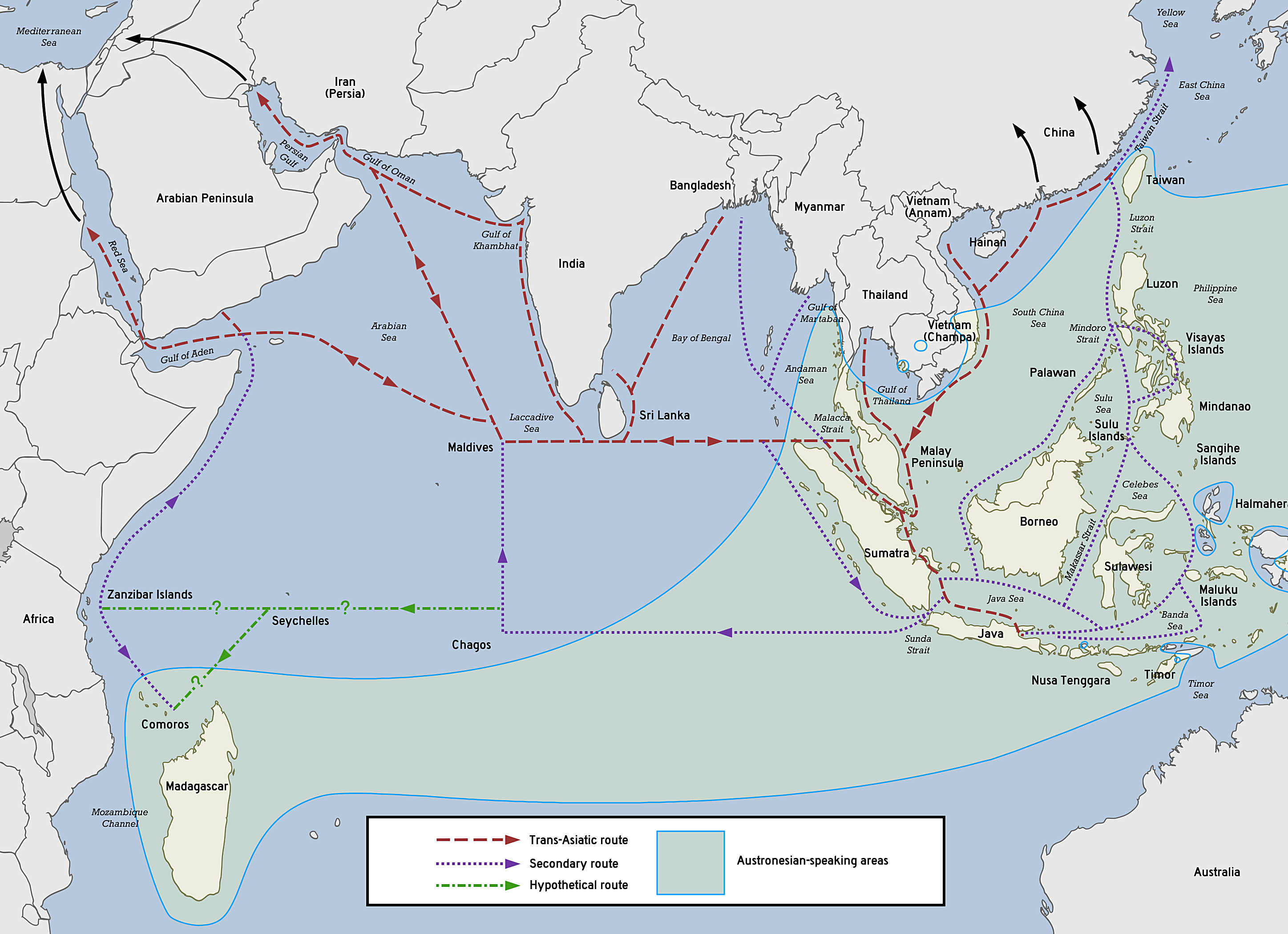
Austronesian proto-historic and historic maritime trade network in the Indian Ocean

The ancient Champa of Vietnam also uniquely developed basket-hulled boats whose hulls were composed of woven and resin-caulked bamboo, either entirely or in conjunction with plank strakes. They ranged from small coracles (o thúng) to large oceangoing trading ships like the ghe mành.

The acquisition of catamaran and outrigger technology by non-Austronesian peoples in Sri Lanka and southern India is due to the result of very early Austronesian contact with the region, including the Maldives and the Laccadive Islands, estimated to have occurred around 1000 to 600 BCE and onwards. This may have possibly included limited colonization by people who have since been assimilated. This is still evident in Sri Lankan and South Indian languages. For example, Tamil paṭavu, Telugu paḍava, and Kannada paḍahu, all meaning "ship", are all derived from Proto-Hesperonesian *padaw, "sailboat", with Austronesian cognates like Sundanese parahu, Javanese prau, Kadazan padau, Maranao padaw, Malay perahu, Cebuano paráw, Samoan folau, Hawaiian halau, and Māori wharau.

=== Architecture ===
Austronesian architecture is diverse but often shares certain characteristics that indicate a common origin. The reconstructed Proto-Austronesian and Proto-Malayo-Polynesian forms of various terms for "house", "building", or "granary" among the different linguistic subgroups of Austronesians include *rumaq ("house"); (Note: Cognates include Paiwan umaq, T'boli lumak, Malay rumah, Acehnese rumòh, Sawai um, Rotinese uma, Torau ruma, and Chuukese iimw.) *balay ("public building", "community house", or "guest house"); (Note: Cognates include Tagalog báhay, Cebuano baláy, Malay balai, Balinese bale, Fijian vale, Hawaiian hale, and Māori whare.) *lepaw ("hut", "field hut", or "granary"); (Note: Cognates include Kavalan repaw, Kenyah lepaw, Malay lepau, and Sika lepo.) *kamaliR ("bachelor's house", or "men's house"); (Note: Cognates include Yami kamalig, Tagalog kamálig, Old Javanese kamalir, Hawu kemali, and Papitalai kamal.) and *banua ("inhabited land", or "community territory"). (Note: Cognates include Cebuano banwá, Iban menoa, Banggai bonua, Selaru hnua, Sawai pnu, Fijian vanua, Samoan fanua, Hawaiian honua, and Māori whenua.)

Austronesian structures commonly have raised floors. The structures are raised on piles, usually with space underneath also utilized for storage or domestic animals. The raised design has multiple advantages, including mitigating damage during flooding and (in very tall examples) acting as defensive structures during conflicts. The house posts are also distinctively capped with larger-diameter discs at the top, to prevent vermin and pests from entering the structures by climbing them. Austronesian houses and other structures are usually built in wetlands and alongside bodies of water but can also be constructed in the highlands or even directly on shallow water.

Building structures on pilings is believed to be derived from the design of raised granaries and storehouses, which are highly important status symbols among the ancestrally rice-cultivating Austronesians. The rice granary shrine was also the archetypal religious building among Austronesian cultures and was used to store carvings of ancestor spirits and local deities.

Another common feature are pitched roofs with ornamented gables. The most notable of these are saddlebacked roofs, a design common for longhouses used for village meetings or ceremonies. The overall effect of this is reminiscent of a boat, underlining the strong maritime connections of Austronesian cultures. The boat motif is common throughout, particularly in Eastern Indonesia. In some ethnic groups, the houses are built on platforms that resemble catamarans. Among the Nage people, a woven representation of a boat is added to the ridge of the roof; among the Manggarai people, the roofs of houses are shaped like an upside-down boat; while among the people of Tanimbar and eastern Flores, the ridge itself is carved into a representation of a boat. Furthermore, elements of Austronesian structures (as well as society in general) are often referred to in terminologies used for boats and sailing. These include calling elements of structures "masts", "sails", or "rudders", or calling the village leaders "captains" or "steersmen". In the case of the Philippines, the villages themselves are referred to as barangay, from an alternate form of balangay, a type of sailboat used for trading and colonization.

Austronesian buildings have spiritual significance, often containing what has been coined by anthropologist James J. Fox as a "ritual attractor". These are specific posts, beams, platforms, altars, and so on that embody the house as a whole, usually consecrated at the time of building.

The Austronesian house itself also often symbolizes various aspects of indigenous Austronesian cosmology and animism. In the majority of cases, the loft of the house (usually placed above the hearth), is considered to be the domain of deities and spirits. It is essentially a raised granary built into the structure of the house itself and functioning as a second floor. It is commonly used to store sacred objects (like effigies of granary idols or deceased ancestors), heirlooms, and other important objects. These areas are usually not part of the regular living space and may only be accessible to certain members of the family or after performing a specific ritual. Other parts of the house may also be associated with certain deities, and thus certain activities like receiving guests or conducting marriage ceremonies can only be performed in specific areas.

While rice cultivation was not among the technologies carried into Remote Oceania, raised storehouses still survived. The pātaka of the Māori people is an example. The largest pātaka are elaborately adorned with carvings and are often the tallest buildings in the Māori pā. These were used to store implements, weapons, ships, and other valuables; while smaller pātaka were used to store provisions. A special type of pātaka, supported by a single tall post, also had ritual importance and was used to isolate high-born children during their training for leadership.

The majority of Austronesian structures are not permanent. They are made from perishable materials like wood, bamboo, plant fiber, and leaves. Similar to traditional Austronesian boats, they do not use nails but are traditionally constructed solely by joints, weaving, ties, and dowels. Elements of the structures are repaired and replaced regularly or as they get damaged. Because of this, archaeological records of prehistoric Austronesian structures are usually limited to traces of house posts, with no way of determining the original building plans.

Indirect evidence of traditional Austronesian architecture, however, can be gleaned from their contemporary representations in art, such as friezes on the walls of later Hindu-Buddhist stone temples (like in reliefs at Borobudur and Prambanan). But these are limited to the recent centuries. They can also be reconstructed linguistically from shared terms for architectural elements, like ridge poles, thatch, rafters, house posts, hearths, notched log ladders, storage racks, public buildings, and so on. Linguistic evidence also makes it clear that stilt houses were already present among Austronesian groups since at least the Late Neolithic.

In modern Indonesia, varying styles are collectively known as rumah adat.

Arbi et al. (2013) have also noted the striking similarities between Austronesian architecture and Japanese traditional raised architecture (shinmei-zukuri). Particularly the buildings of the Ise Grand Shrine, which contrast with the pit-houses typical of the Neolithic Yayoi period. They propose significant Neolithic contact between the people of southern Japan and Austronesians or pre-Austronesians that occurred prior to the spread of Han Chinese cultural influence to the islands. Rice cultivation is also believed to have been introduced to Japan from a para-Austronesian group from coastal eastern China. Waterson (2009) has also argued that the architectural tradition of stilt houses is originally Austronesian and that similar building traditions in Japan and mainland Asia (notably among Kra-Dai and Austroasiatic-speaking groups) correspond to contacts with a prehistoric Austronesian network.

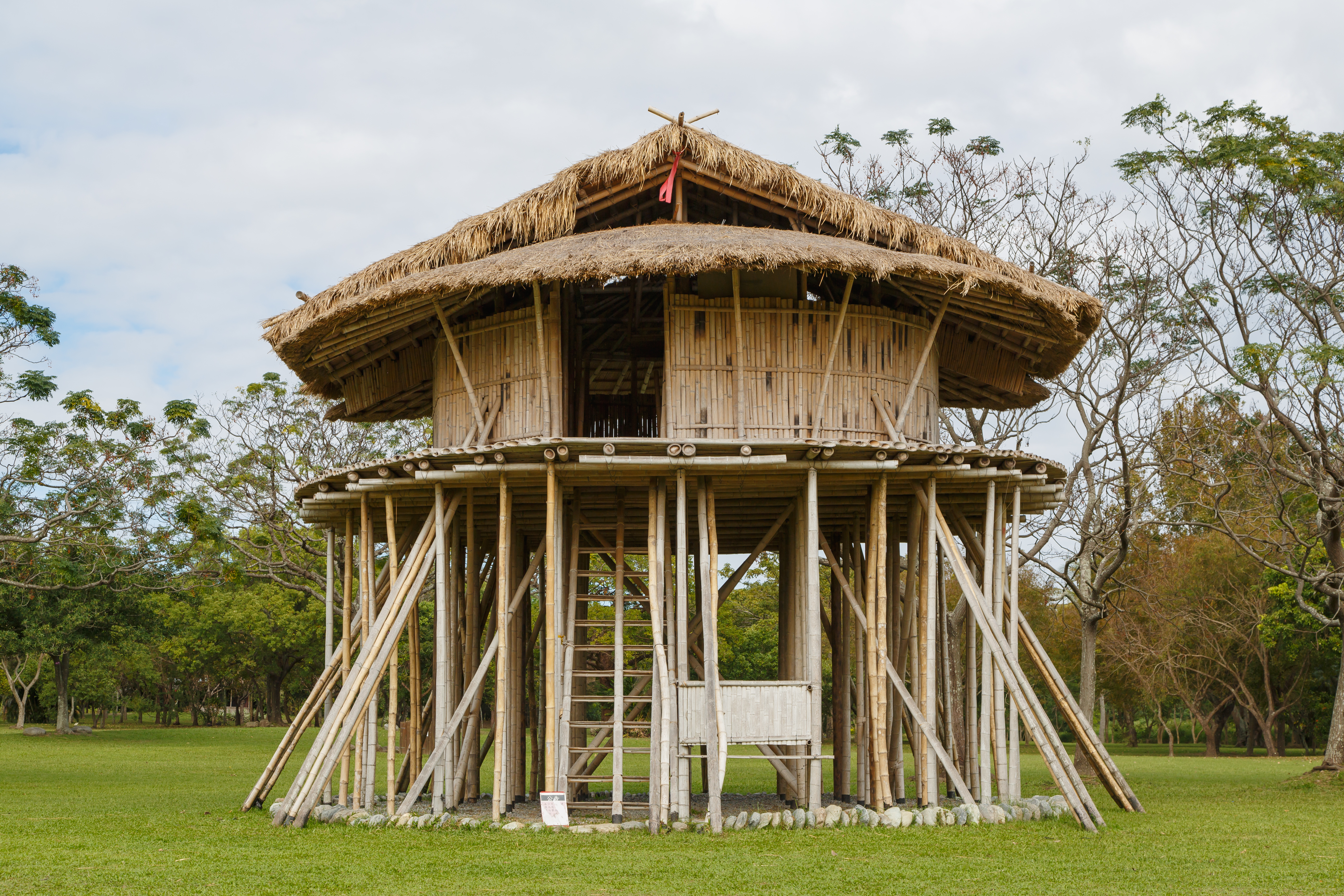
Aboriginal Taiwanese architecture

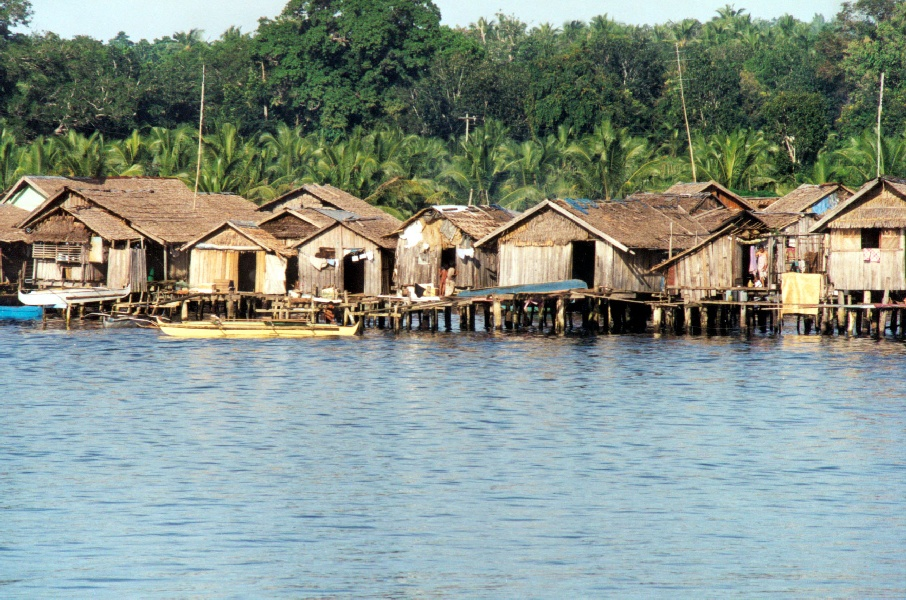
Sama-Bajau villages are typically built directly on shallow water.

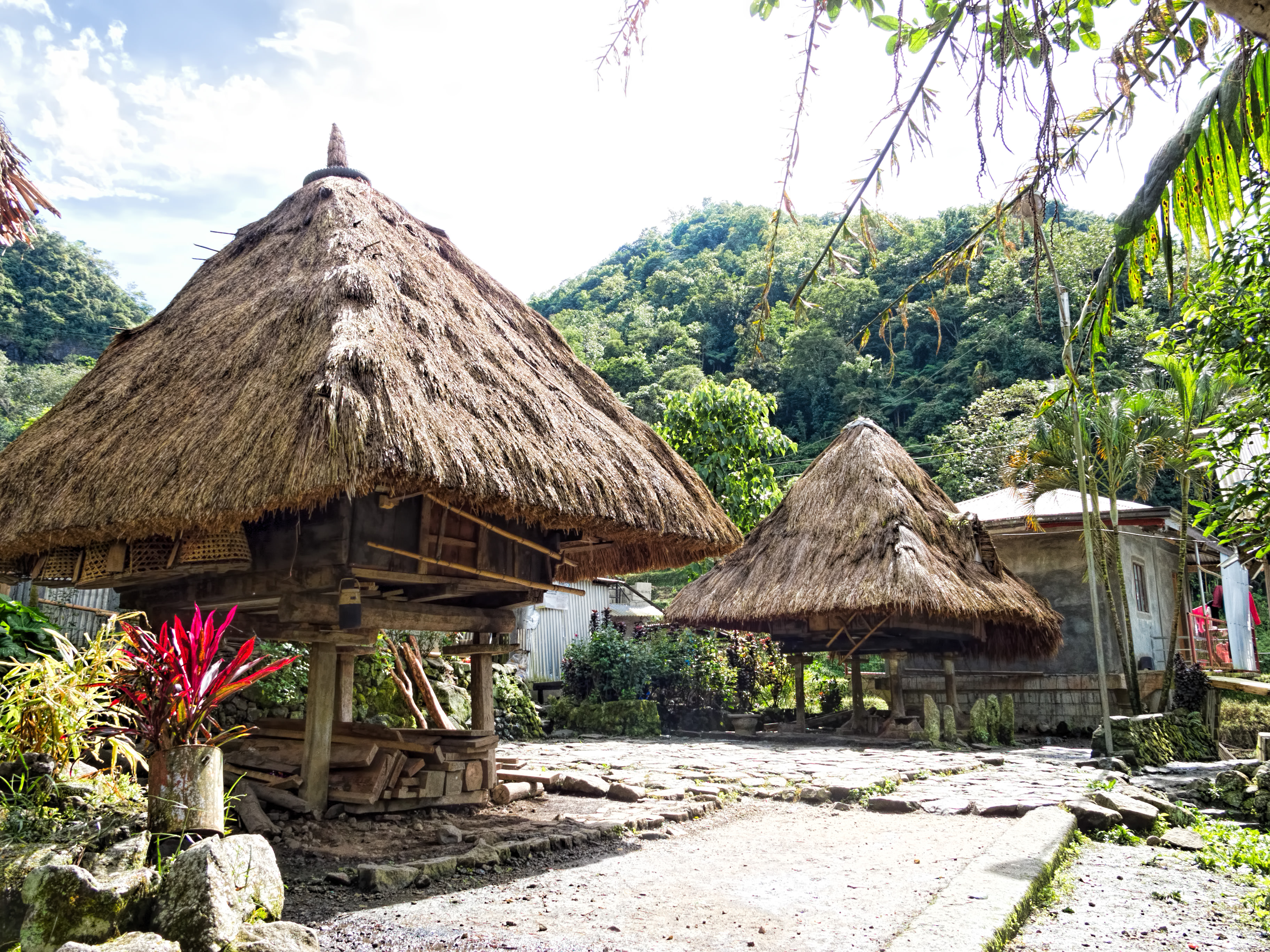
The raised bale houses of the Ifugao people, with capped house posts

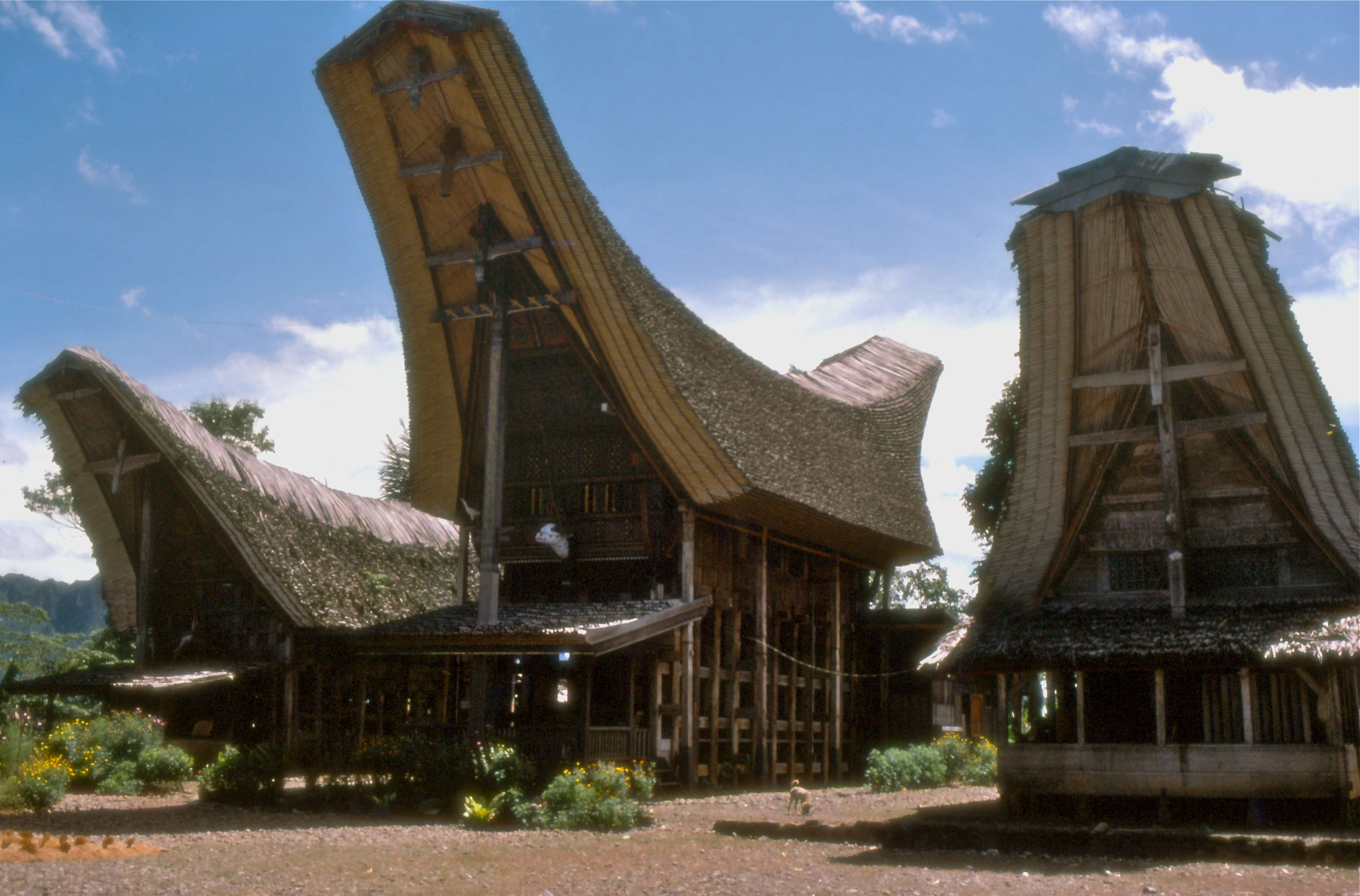
Tongkonan houses of the Toraja people, with the distinctive saddleback roofs reminiscent of boats

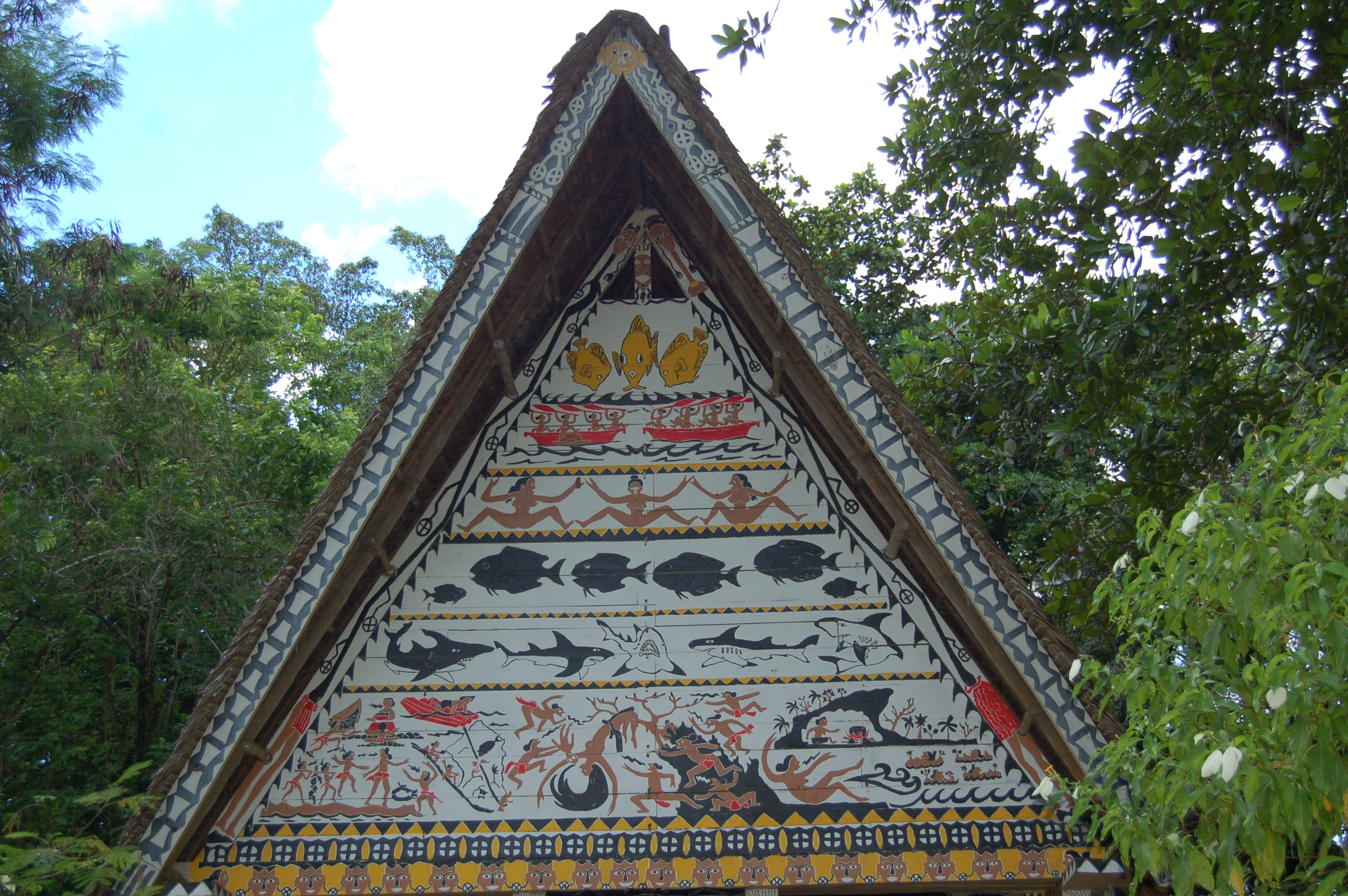
Bai meeting house of the Palauan people, with colorfully decorated gables

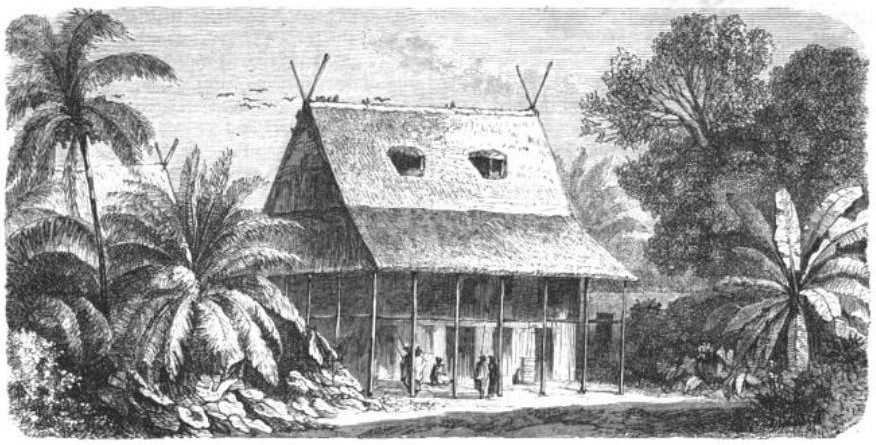
Trano of the Betsimisaraka people

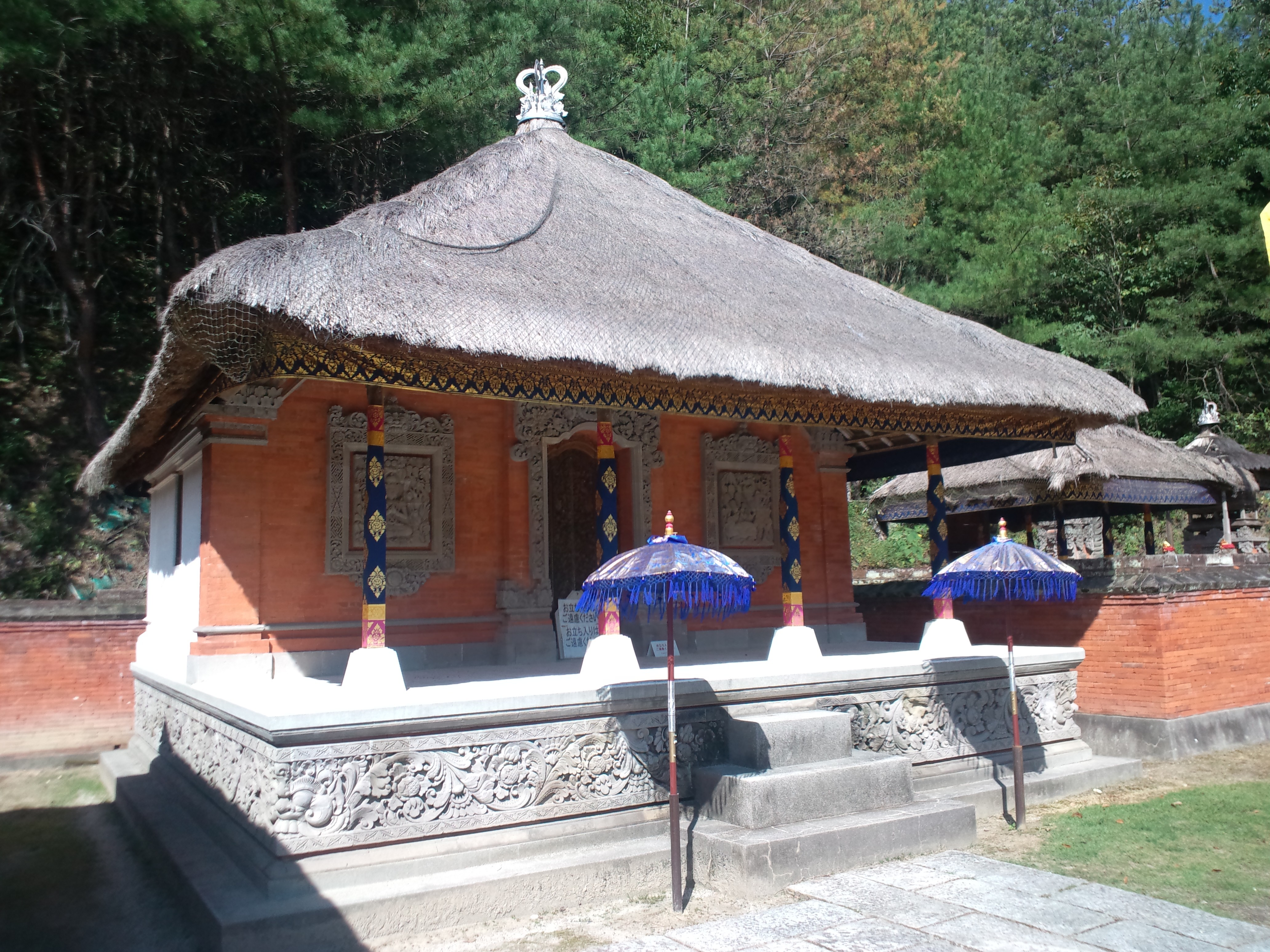
Balé meten of the Balinese people

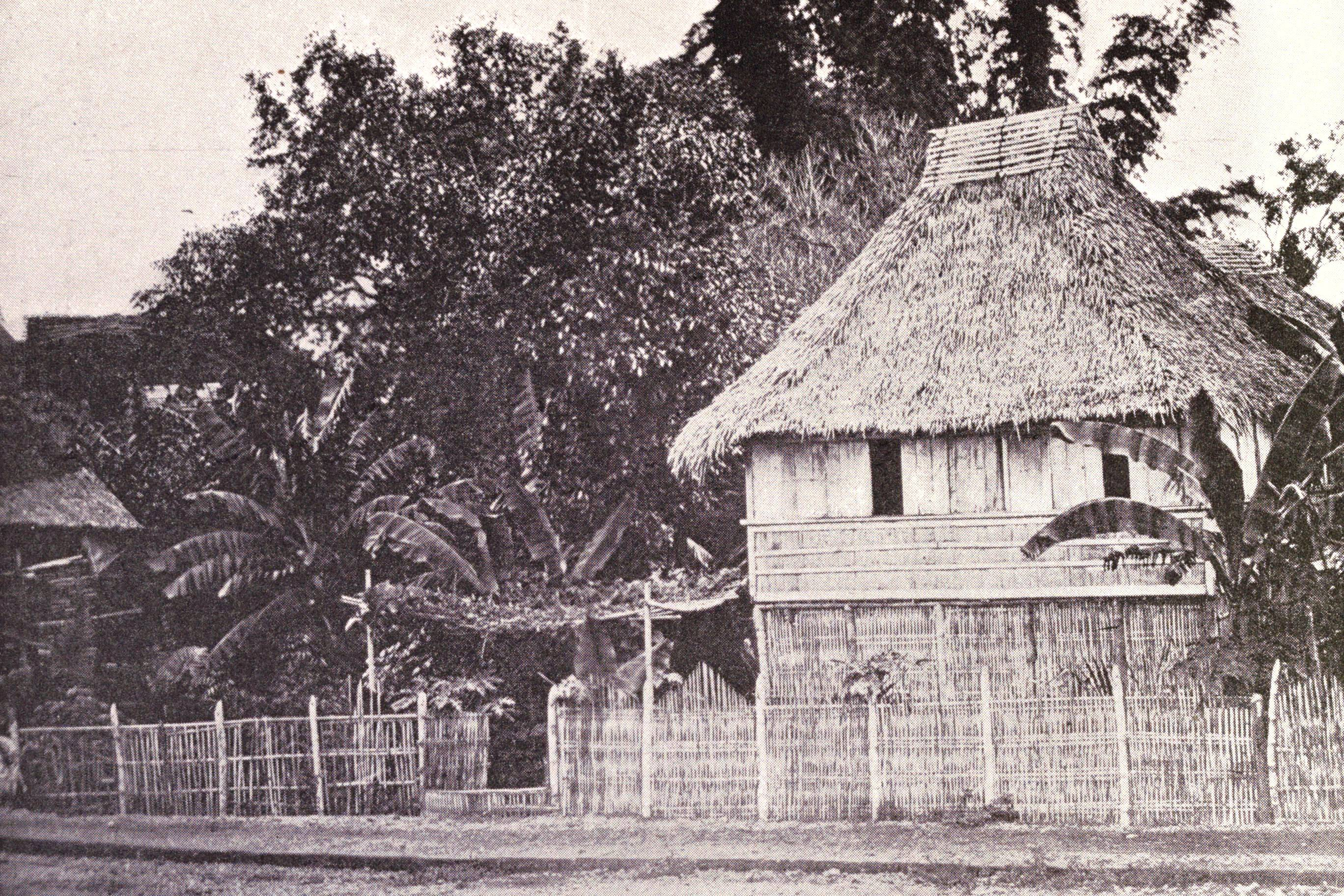
Bahay kubo of the Tagalog people

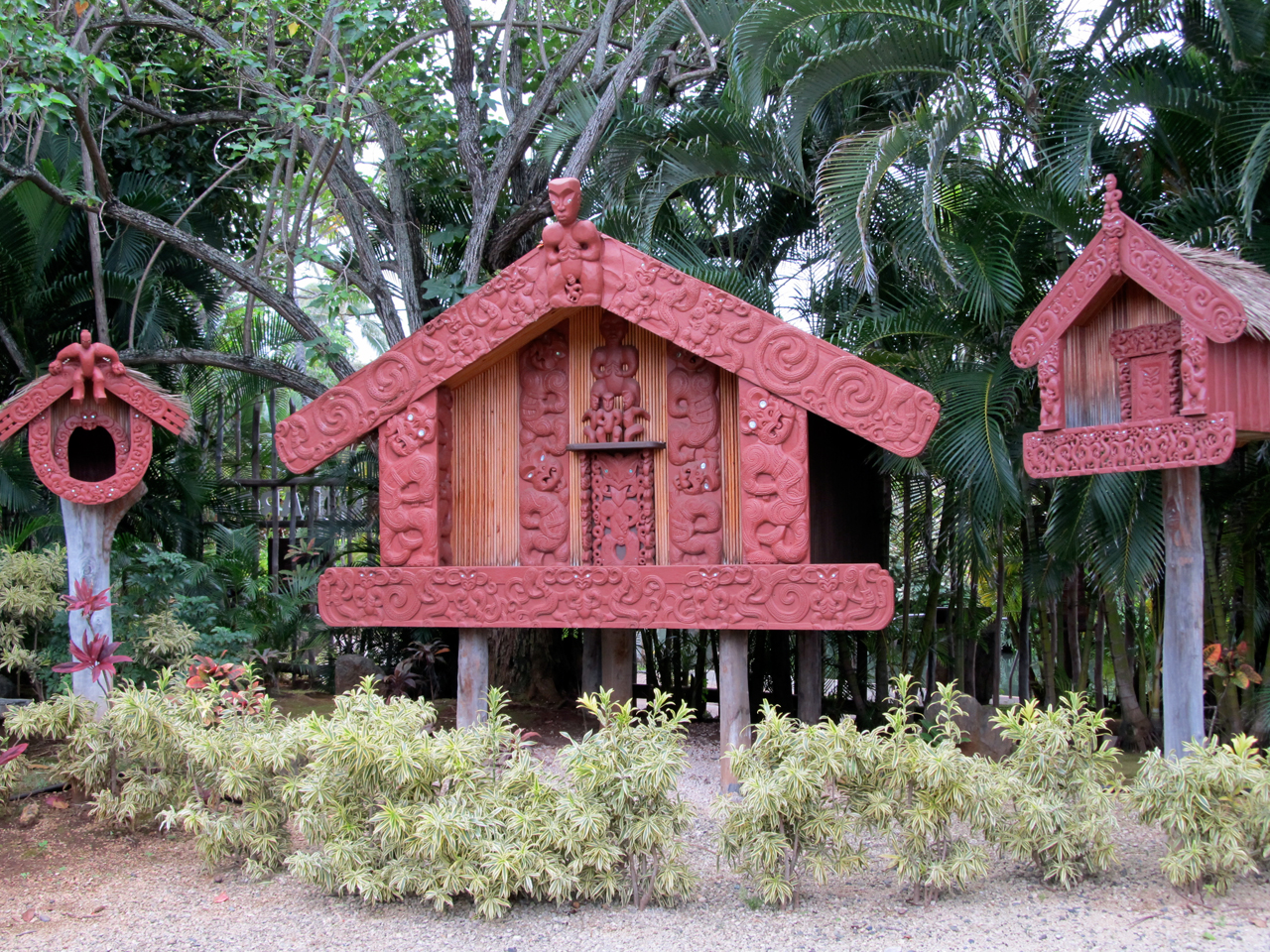
Māori pātaka storehouses

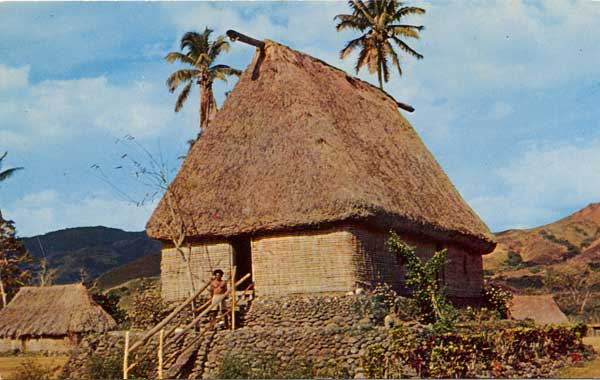
Bure of the Fijian people

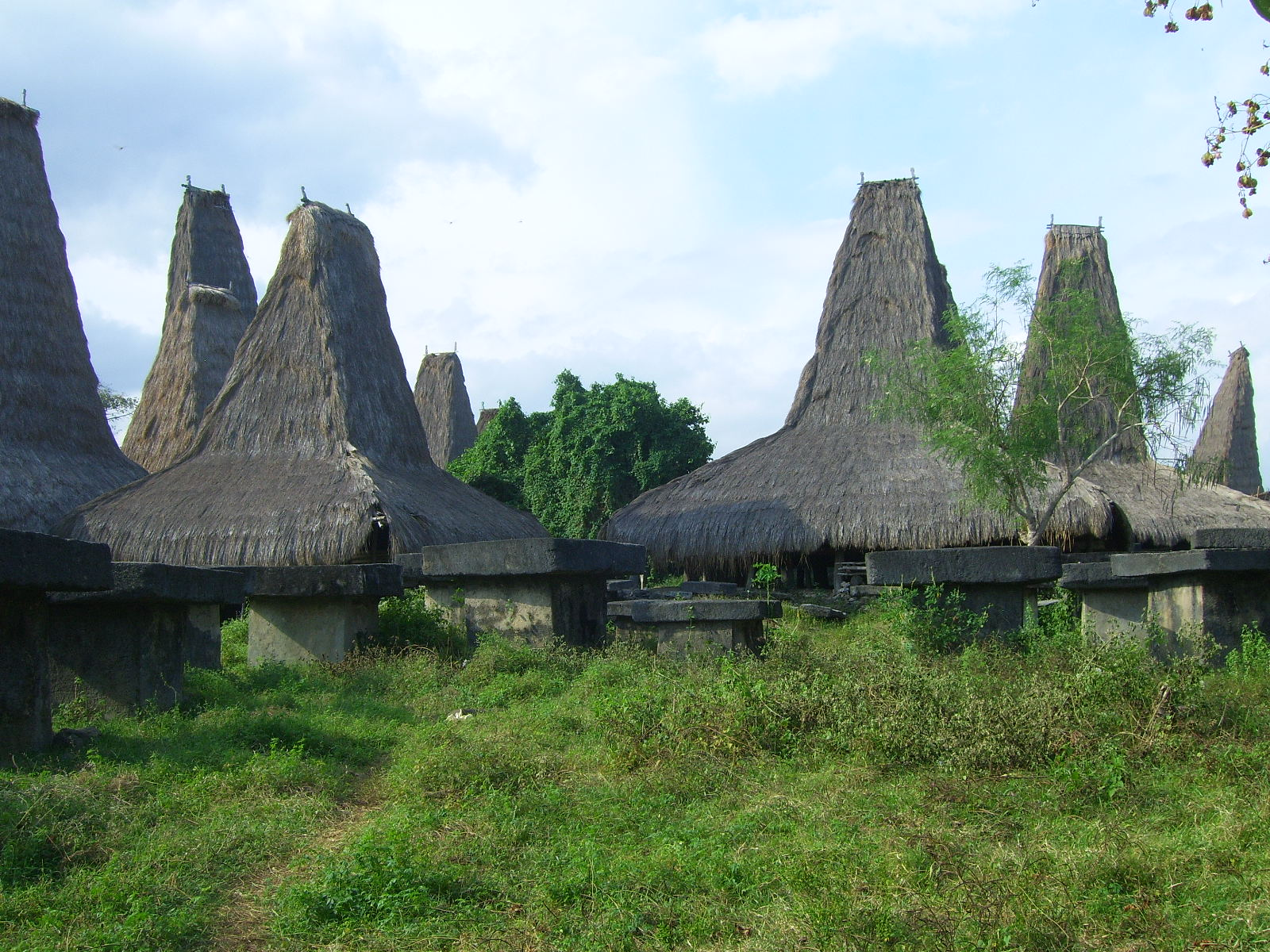
Uma mbatangu of the Sumba people

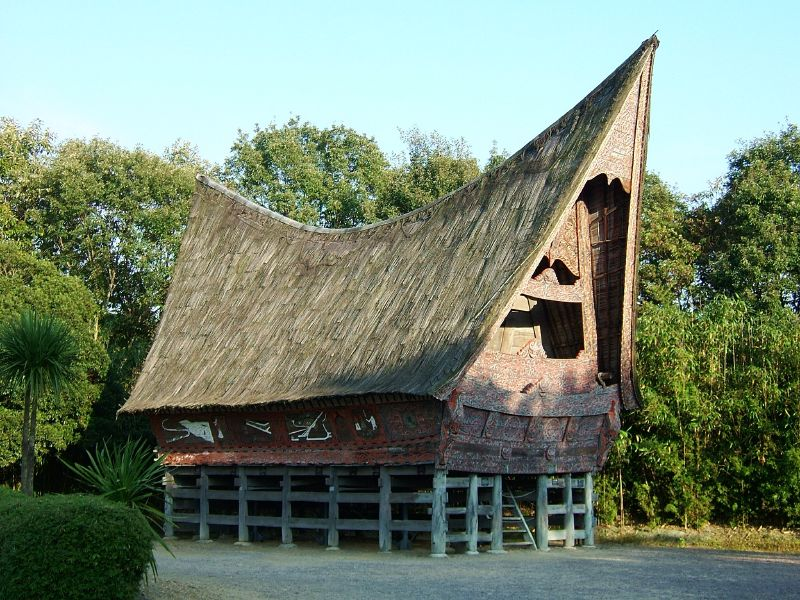
Jabu of the Batak people

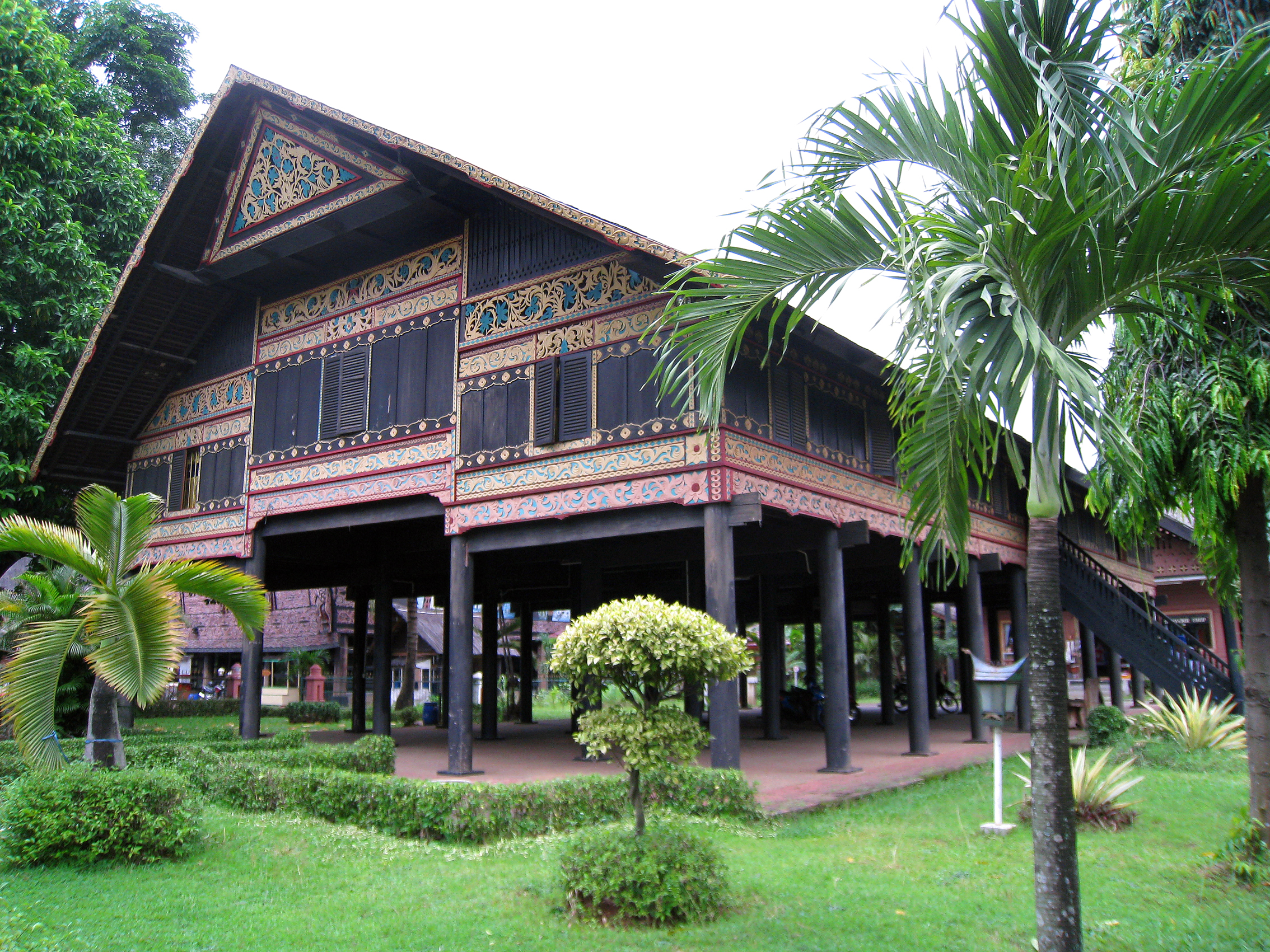
Rumoh of the Acehnese people

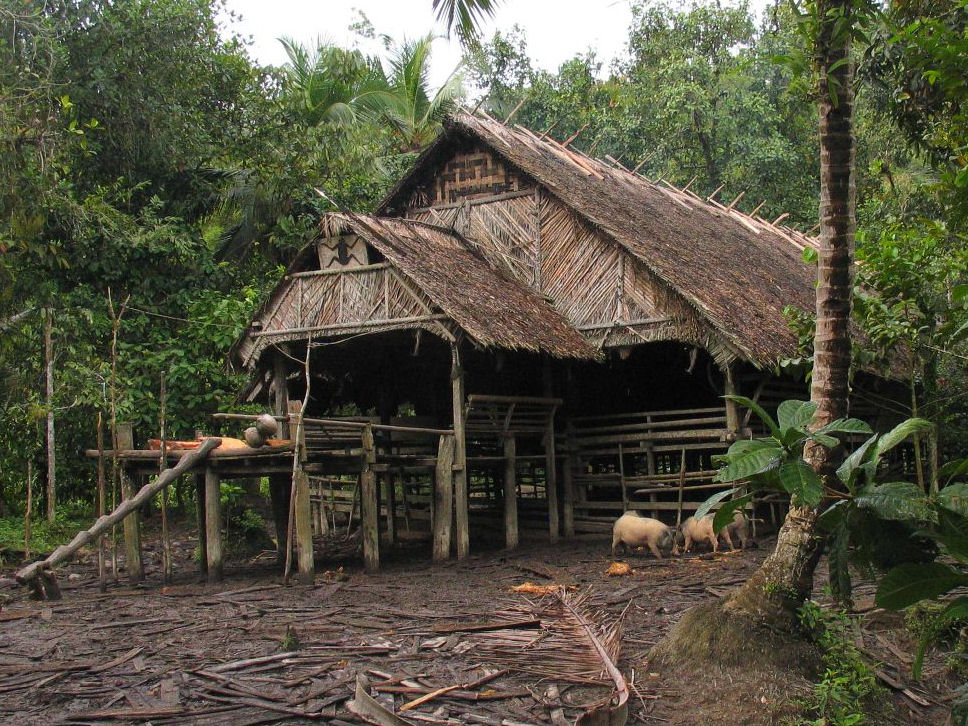
Uma longhouse traditional vernacular houses of Mentawai people

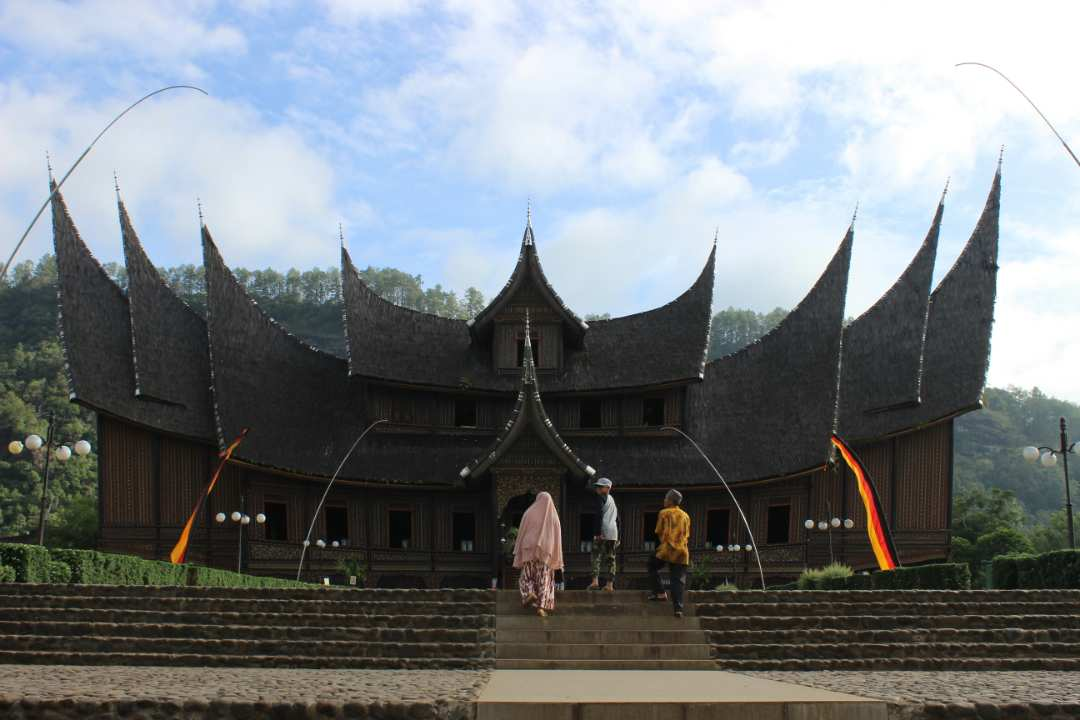
Rumah gadang of the Minangkabau people

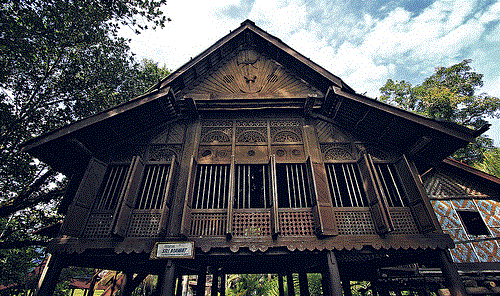
Rumah limas Kedah of the Malay people

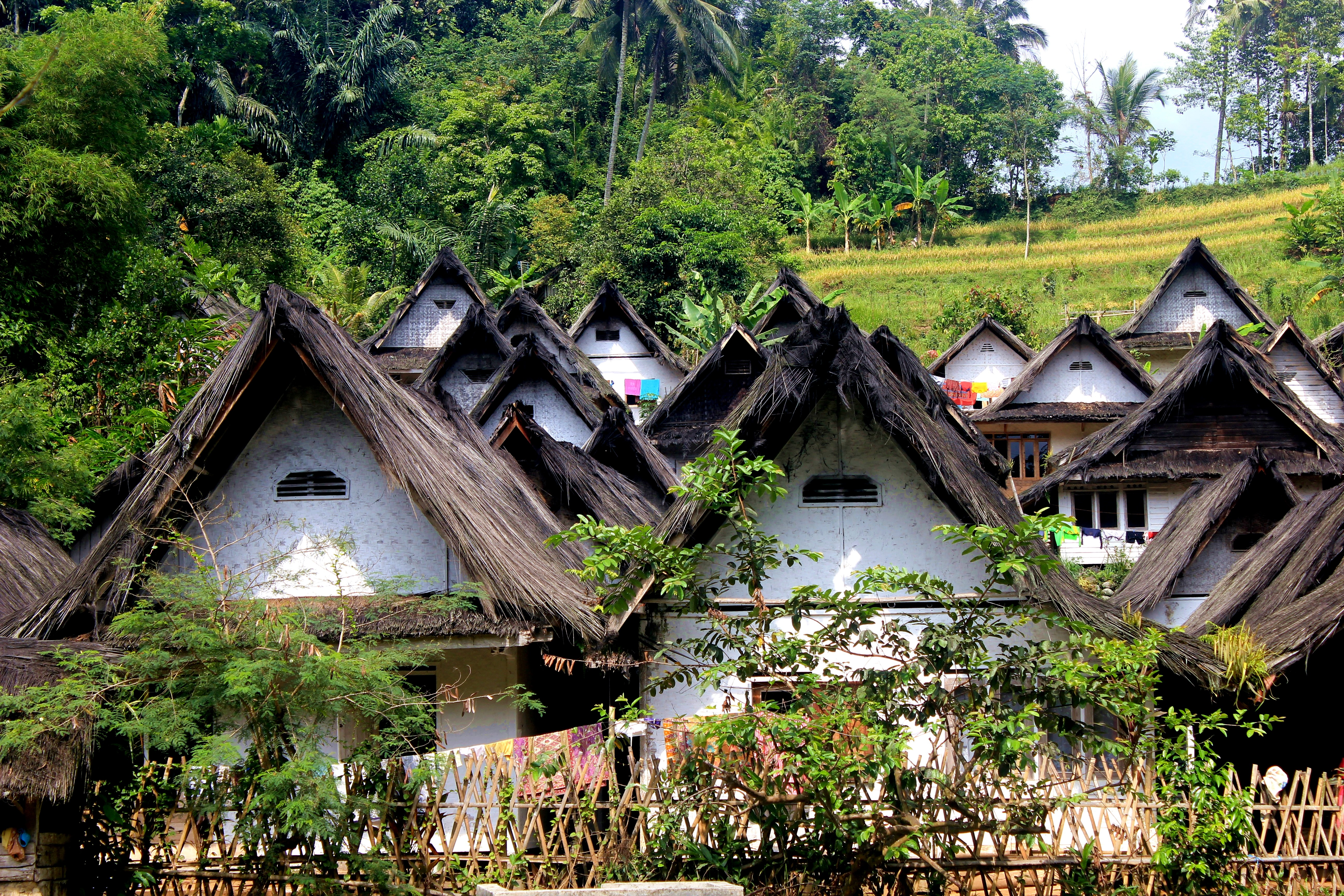
Traditional Tagog anjing roof tiles of the Sundanese people

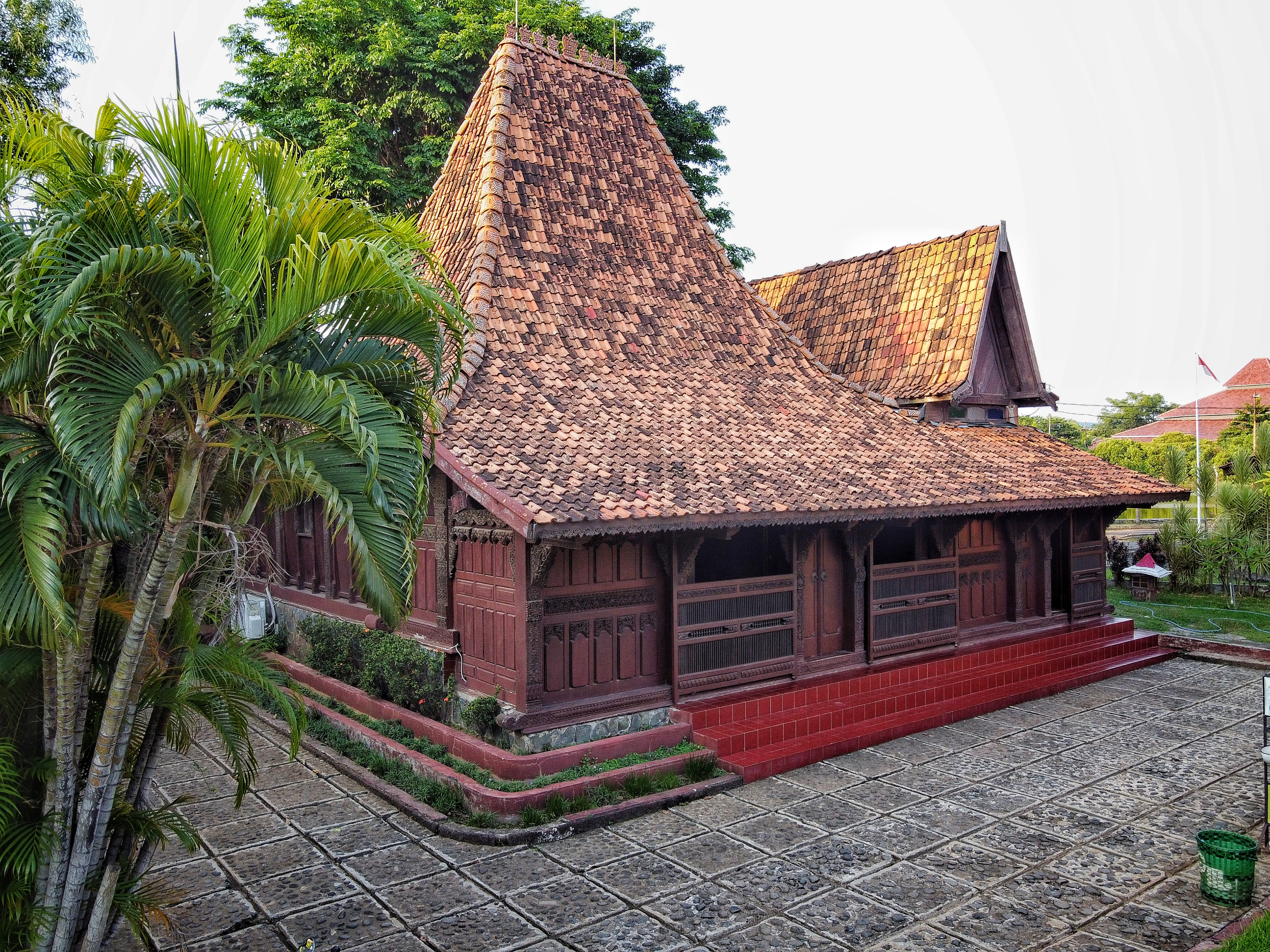
Joglo traditional house, commonly used by Javanese people

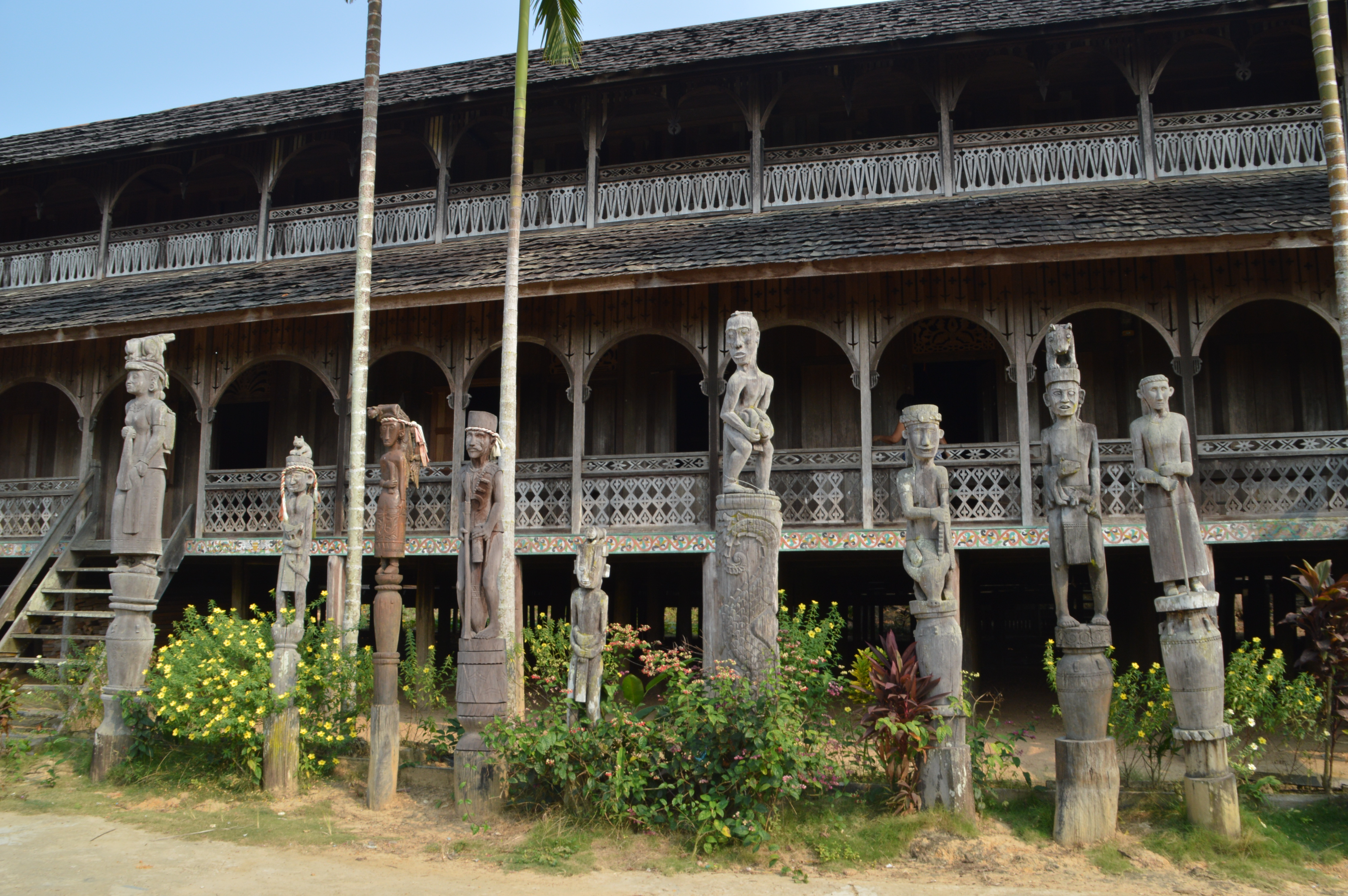
Lamin house with Blontang decoration which used by Dayak people

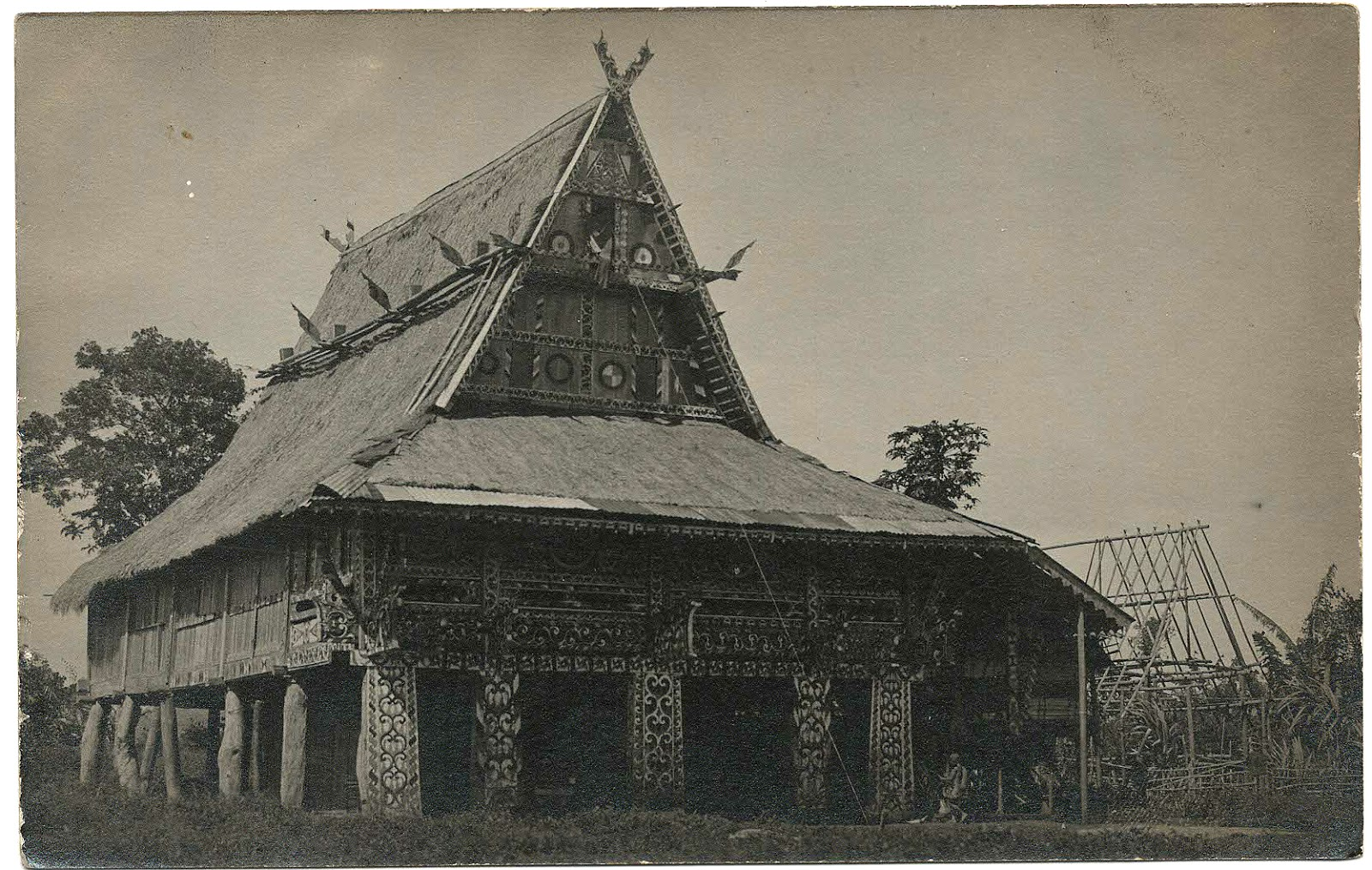
Torogan of the Maranao people, with decorative wing-like awang boat prows (panolong)

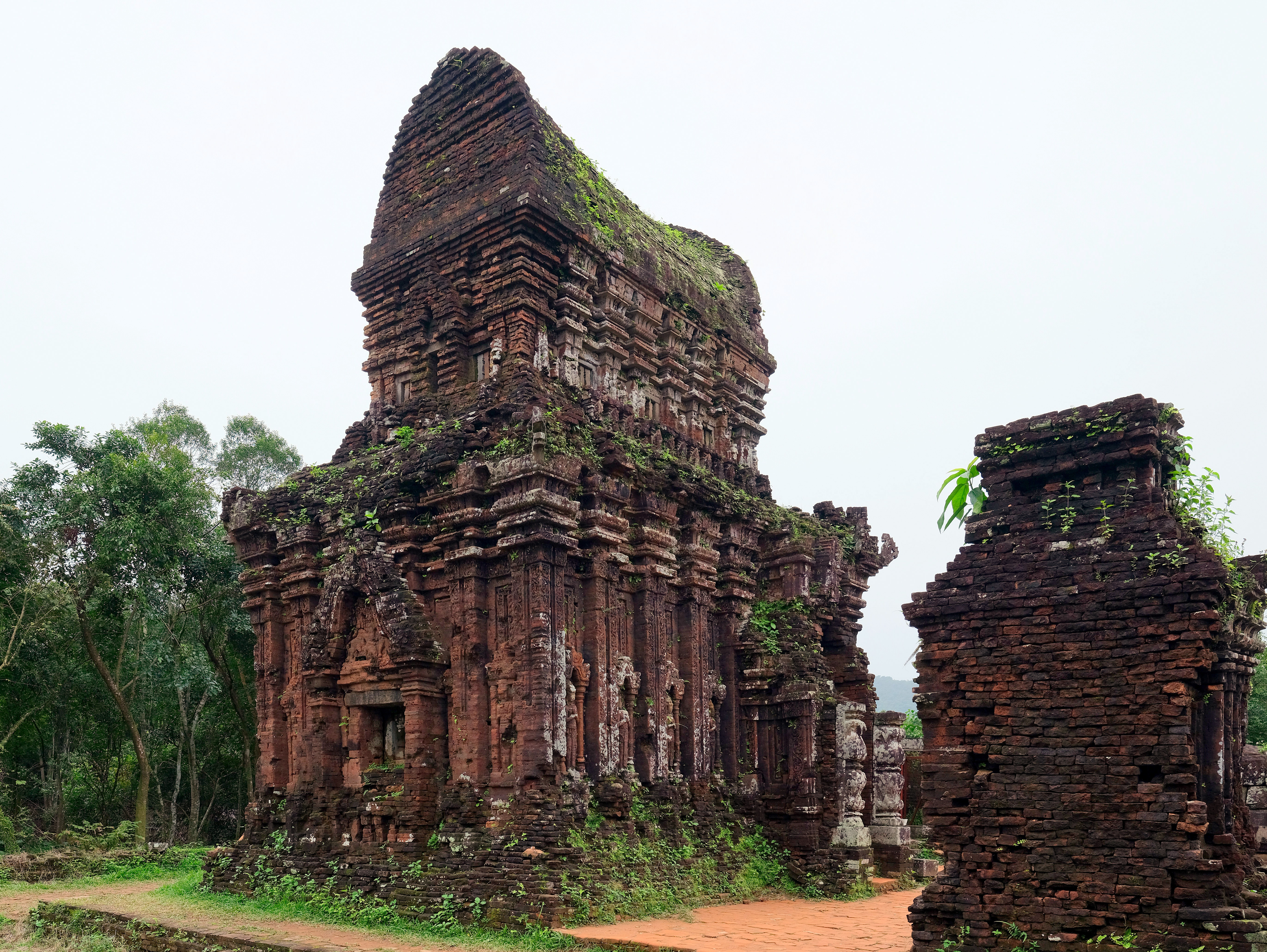
The B5 structure, a stone storehouse with distinctive boat-shaped roofs exemplifying Champa architecture in Mỹ Sơn, southern Vietnam. (c. 10th century)

=== Pottery ===
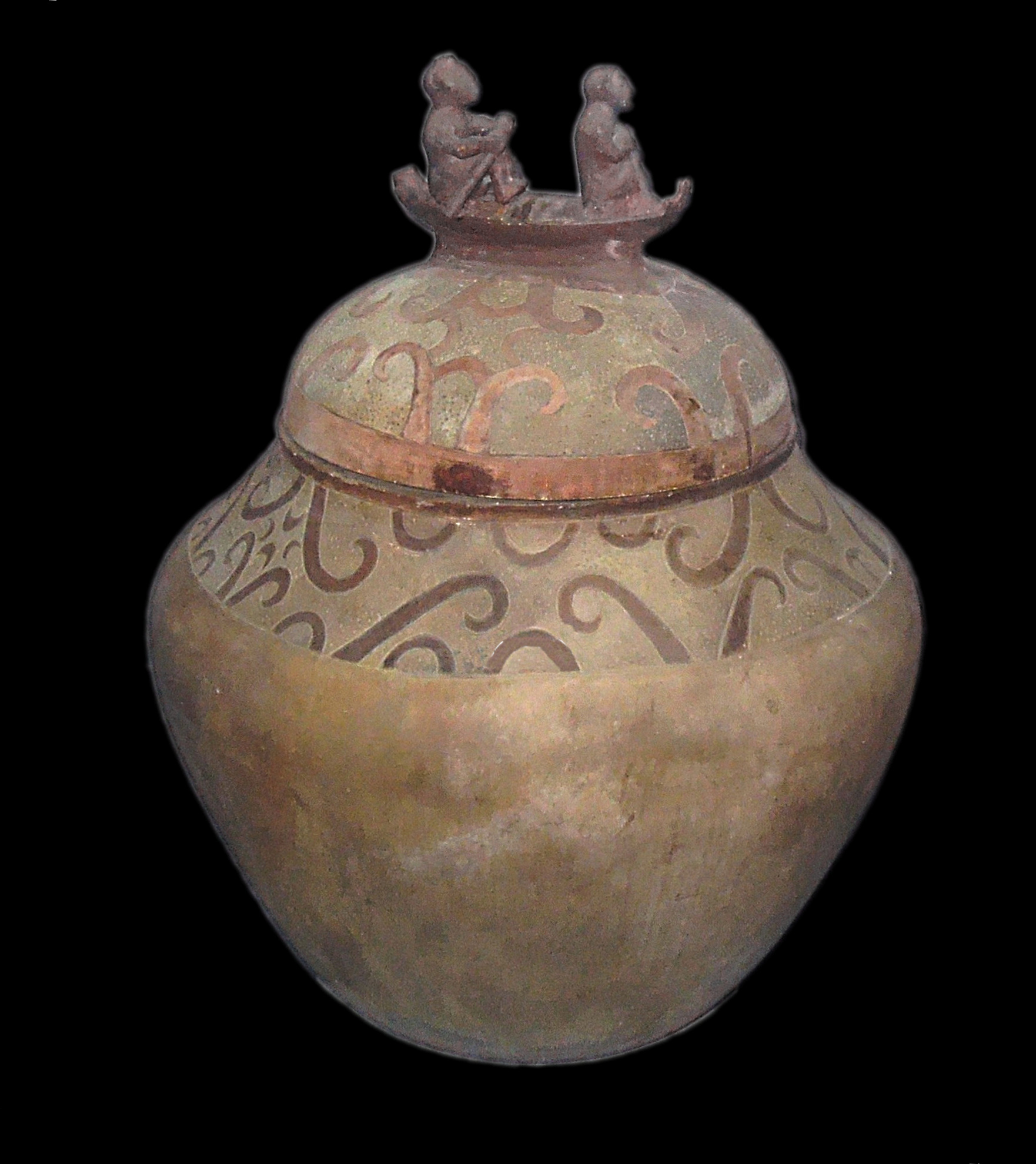
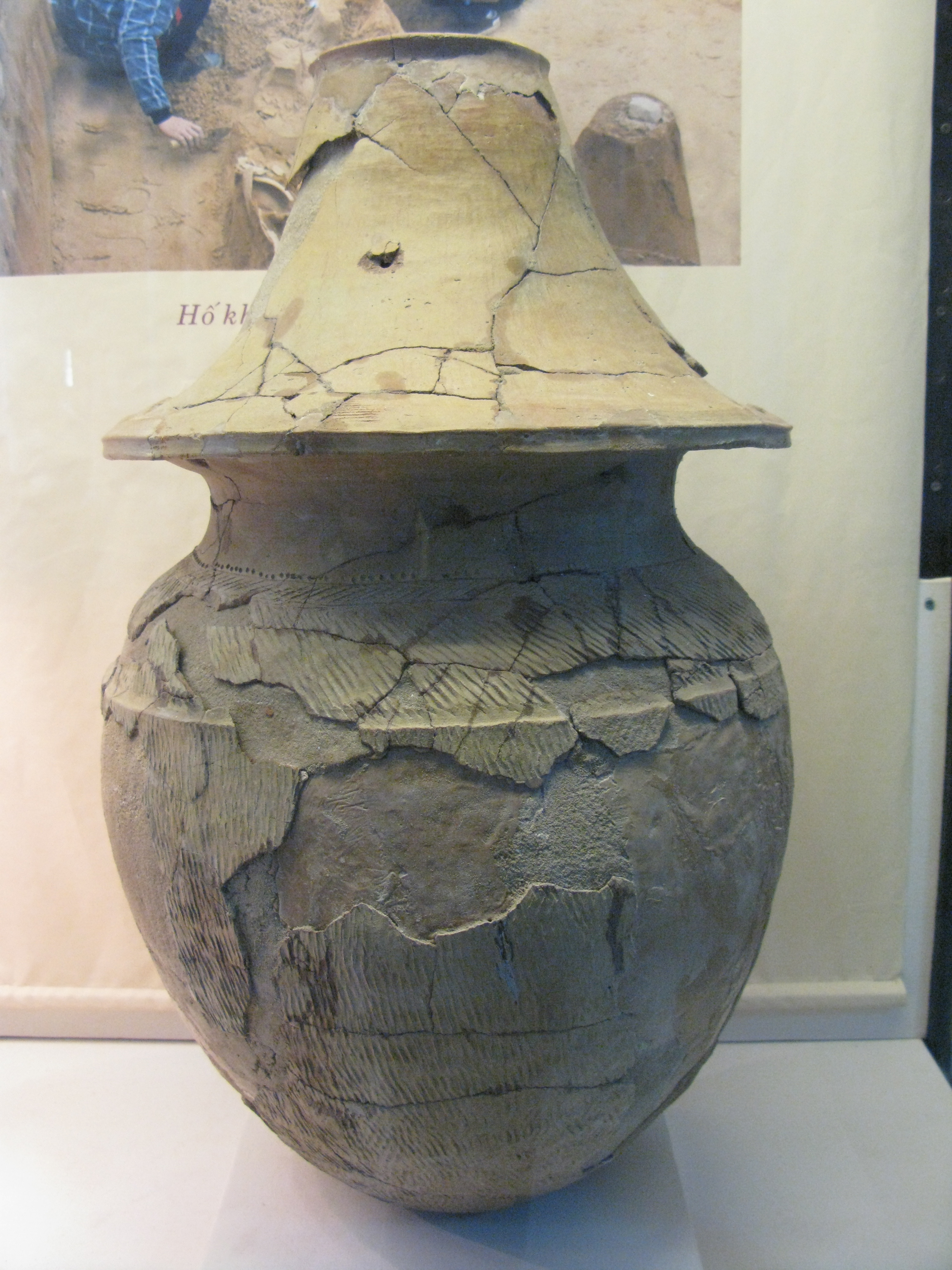
Left: The Manunggul Jar, a secondary burial jar from the Tabon Caves of Palawan, Philippines (c. 890–710 BCE)
Right: Capped burial jar from the Sa Huỳnh culture of central Vietnam (1000 BCE-200 CE)

Outside of Taiwan, assemblages of red-slipped pottery, plainware, and incised and stamped pottery associated with Austronesian migrations are first documented from around 2000 to 1800 BCE in the northern Philippines, from sites in the Batanes Islands and the Cagayan Valley of Northern Luzon. From there, pottery technology rapidly spread to the east, south, and southwest.

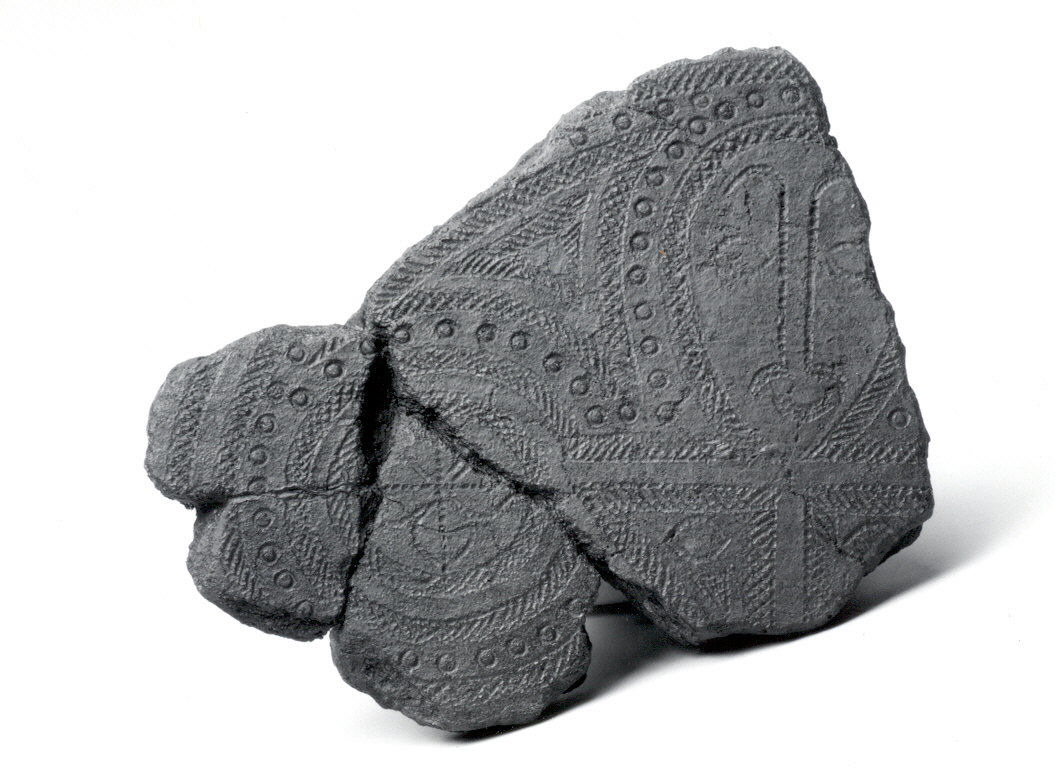
Cast of a Lapita red-slipped earthenware shard from the Santa Cruz Islands (c. 1000 BCE), showing dentate-stamped, circle-stamped, and cross-in-circle decorations. The latter two are shared elements of Neolithic red-slipped pottery from the Nagsabaran Site in the Philippines.

This type of pottery dispersed south and southwest to the rest of Island Southeast Asia. The eastward and southward branches of the migrations converged in Island Melanesia, resulting in what is now known as the Lapita culture, centered around the Bismarck Archipelago.

The oldest known pottery assemblages in Oceania are circle- and punctate/dentate-stamped pottery in the Marianas Islands, securely dated to 1500 BCE–1300 BCE from multiple archaeological sites. It predates the earliest Lapita culture pottery assemblages (c. 1350 –1300 BCE) and bears closest resemblance to a subset of the more diverse Nagsabaran pottery of the northern Philippines. It is currently disputed whether this is indicative of a direct ancient voyage from the northern Philippines to the Marianas. Hung et al. (2011) proposed a direct deliberate voyage from eastern Luzon, which would make it the longest sea crossing undertaken by that time in human history. This has also been proposed by earlier authors like Blust (2000) and Reid (2002), based on linguistics.

Winter et al. (2012), on the other hand, dismissed the similarities as being generic rather than specific to the region. This is from both analysis of the microscopic structure of the shards (indicating manufacturing techniques) and the impossibility of drift voyaging from Luzon, due to the prevailing wind and currents. Instead of a voyage directly from Luzon, they instead proposed an origin either from a direct single voyage from Mindanao (southern Philippines) or Morotai (Maluku Islands) to Guam; or two voyages, with way stations in Palau or Yap.

Hung et al. (2012) pointed out in response that no pottery assemblages older than 2,000 years old have been found in Morotai, which also has a Papuan-speaking population. They also mentioned that present-day data on wind and currents is not a reliable way of ascertaining migration routes, and that the voyages settling Remote Oceania would have been deliberate, not uncontrolled drifting. Similar presumptions by Thor Heyerdahl led to his erroneous conclusion that Polynesia was settled from the Americas. Pottery manufacturing techniques are also diverse, even within a single community. Thus, analysis of manufacturing methods is less significant than comparison of decorative systems. Nevertheless, Hung et al. (2012) emphasized that they also did not discount other sources (yet undiscovered) from the southern Philippines. They also proposed the Eastern Visayas as a likely point of origin. Sources south of the Philippines remain unlikely without further archaeological findings due to their related pottery assemblages being younger than 1500 BCE.

The dentate-stamped pottery of the Lapita culture (c. 1350–1300 BCE) retained elements also found in the Nagsabaran pottery in the Philippines, including stamped circles as well as the cross-in-circle motif. They carried pottery technology as far as Tonga in Polynesia. Pottery technology in Tonga, however, became reduced to undecorated plainware within only two centuries before abruptly disappearing completely by around 400 BCE. The reasons for this are still unknown. Pottery was absent in subsequent migrations to the rest of Remote Oceania, being replaced instead with carved wooden or bamboo containers, bottle gourds, and baskets. However, the geometric designs and stylized figures used in the pottery are still present in other surviving art forms, such as tattooing, weaving, and barkcloth patterns.

A common practice among Austronesians in a large area of Island Southeast Asia is the use of burial jars, which emerged during the Late Neolithic and flourished in the first millennium CE. They are characteristic of a region bordered by the Philippines to the north, southern Sumatra in the southwest, and Sumba and the Maluku Islands in the southeast. However, these did not comprise a single tradition but can be grouped into at least fourteen different traditions scattered across the islands. In most cases, the earliest burial jars used were large indigenous earthenware jars, followed by indigenous or imported stoneware jars (martaban), and finally imported porcelain jars acquired from the burgeoning maritime trade with China and Mainland Southeast Asia around the 14th century CE.

=== Music and dance ===
Slit drums are indigenous Austronesian musical instruments invented and used by Southeast Asian-Austronesian and Oceanic-Austronesian ethnic groups.

Gong ensembles are also a common musical heritage of Island Southeast Asia. The casting of gong instruments is believed to have originated from the Bronze Age cultures of Mainland Southeast Asia. It spread to the Austronesian islands initially through trade as prestige goods. However, mainland Asian gongs were never used in ensembles; the innovation of using gong sets is uniquely Austronesian. Gong ensembles are found in western Malayo-Polynesian groups, though they never penetrated much further east. There are roughly two gong ensemble traditions among Austronesians, which also produced gongs in ancient times.

In western Island Southeast Asia, these traditions are collectively known as gamelan, being centered on the island of Java in Indonesia. They include the celempung of the Malay Peninsula, talempung of northern Sumatra, caklempung of central Sumatra, chalempung of southern Sumatra, bonang of Java, kromong of western Kalimantan, engkromong of Sarawak, and trompong of western Nusa Tenggara.

In eastern Island Southeast Asia, these traditions are known as kulintang and are centered in Mindanao and the Sulu archipelago of the southern Philippines. They include the kulintangan of Sabah and Palawan, kolintang of northern Sulawesi, kulintang of Halmahera and Timor, and totobuang of the southern Maluku Islands.

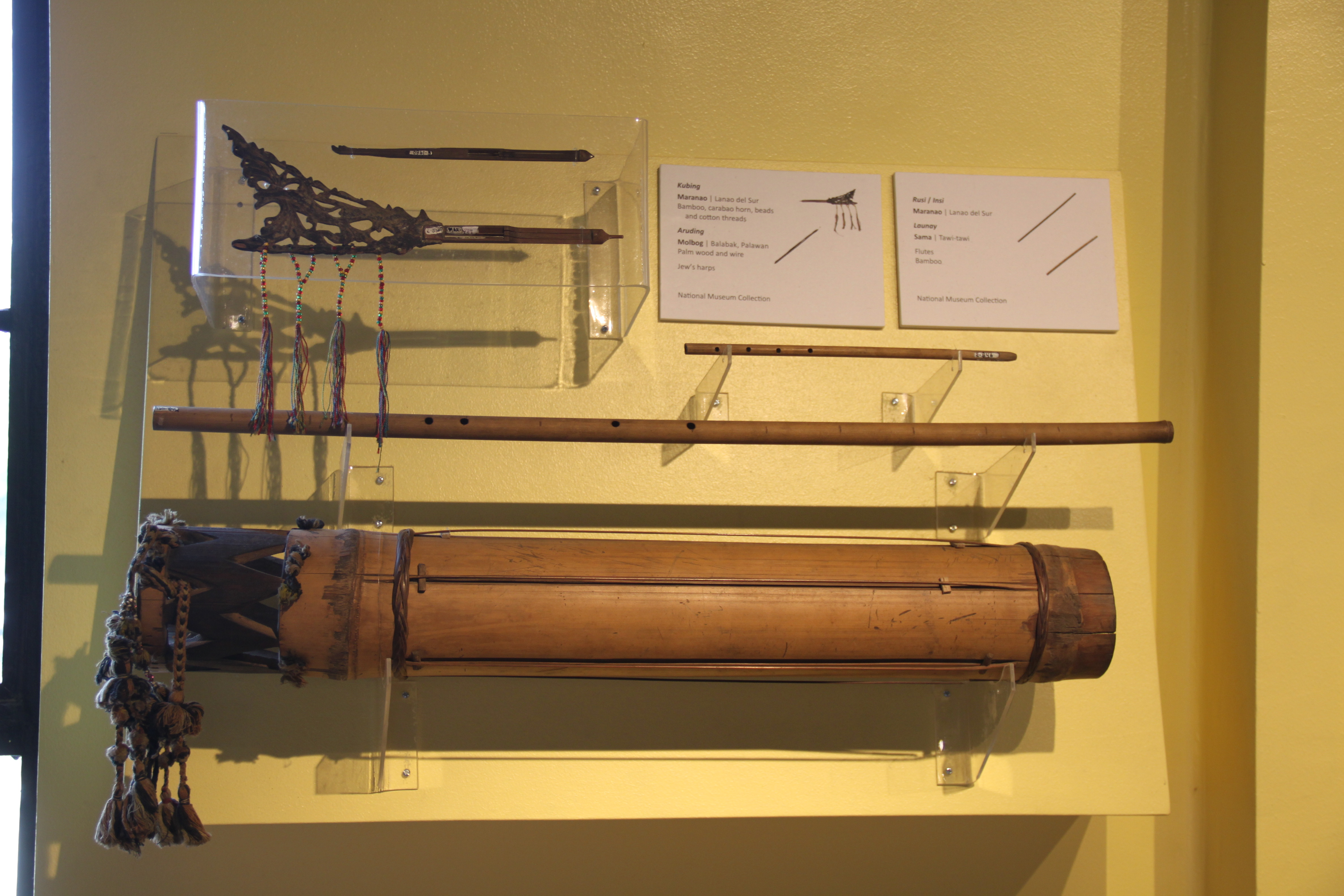
Kubing jaw harps, flutes, and a kagul slit drum

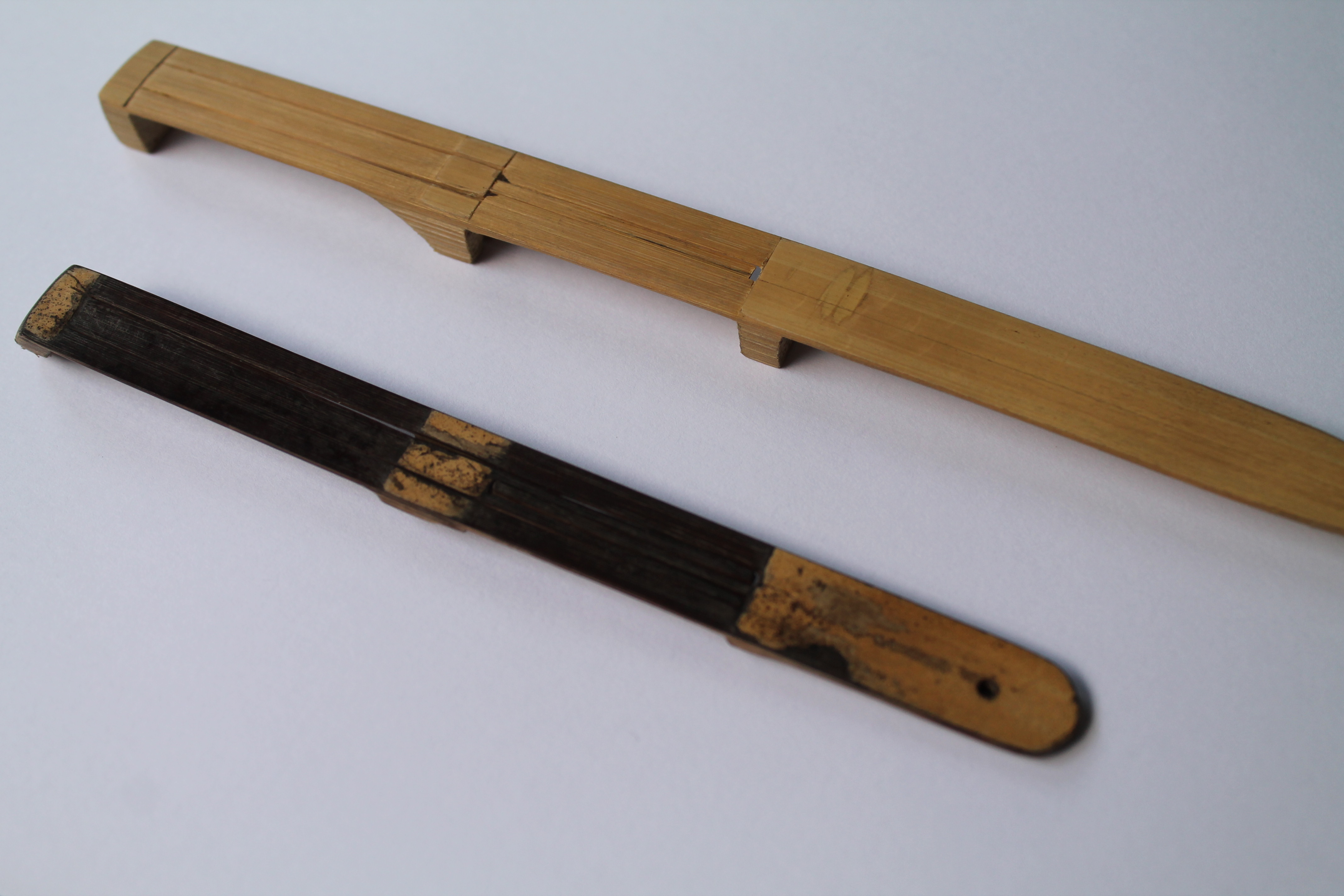
Karinding jaw harps of the Sundanese people

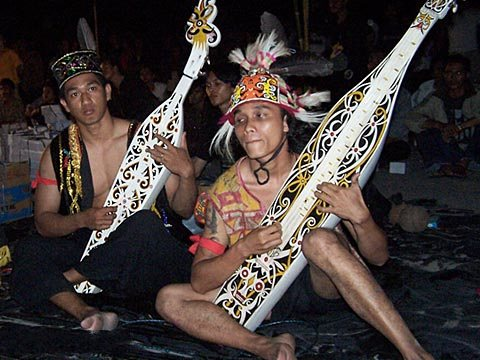
Sapeh, traditional lutes of the Orang Ulu people

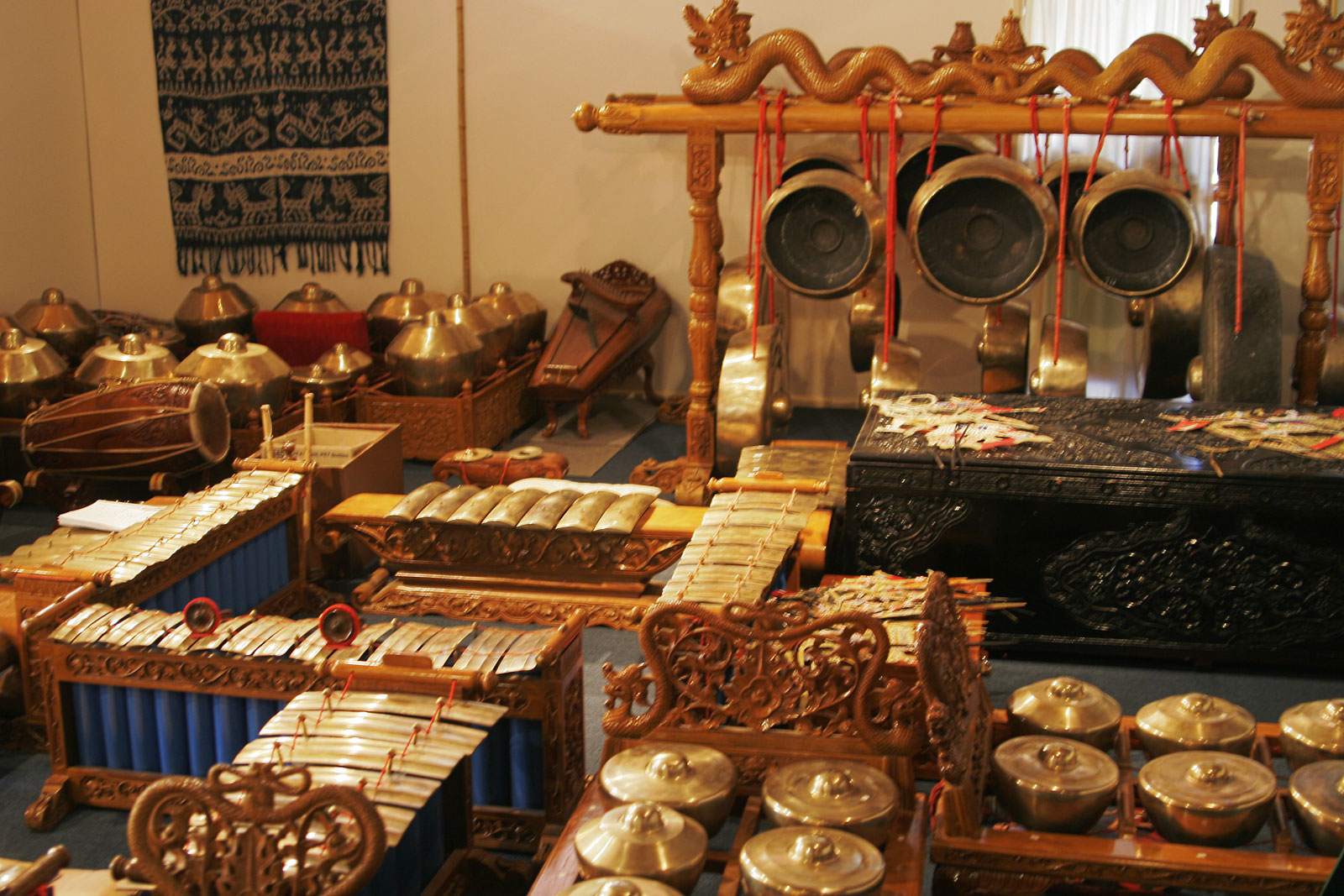
An Javanese gamelan ensemble

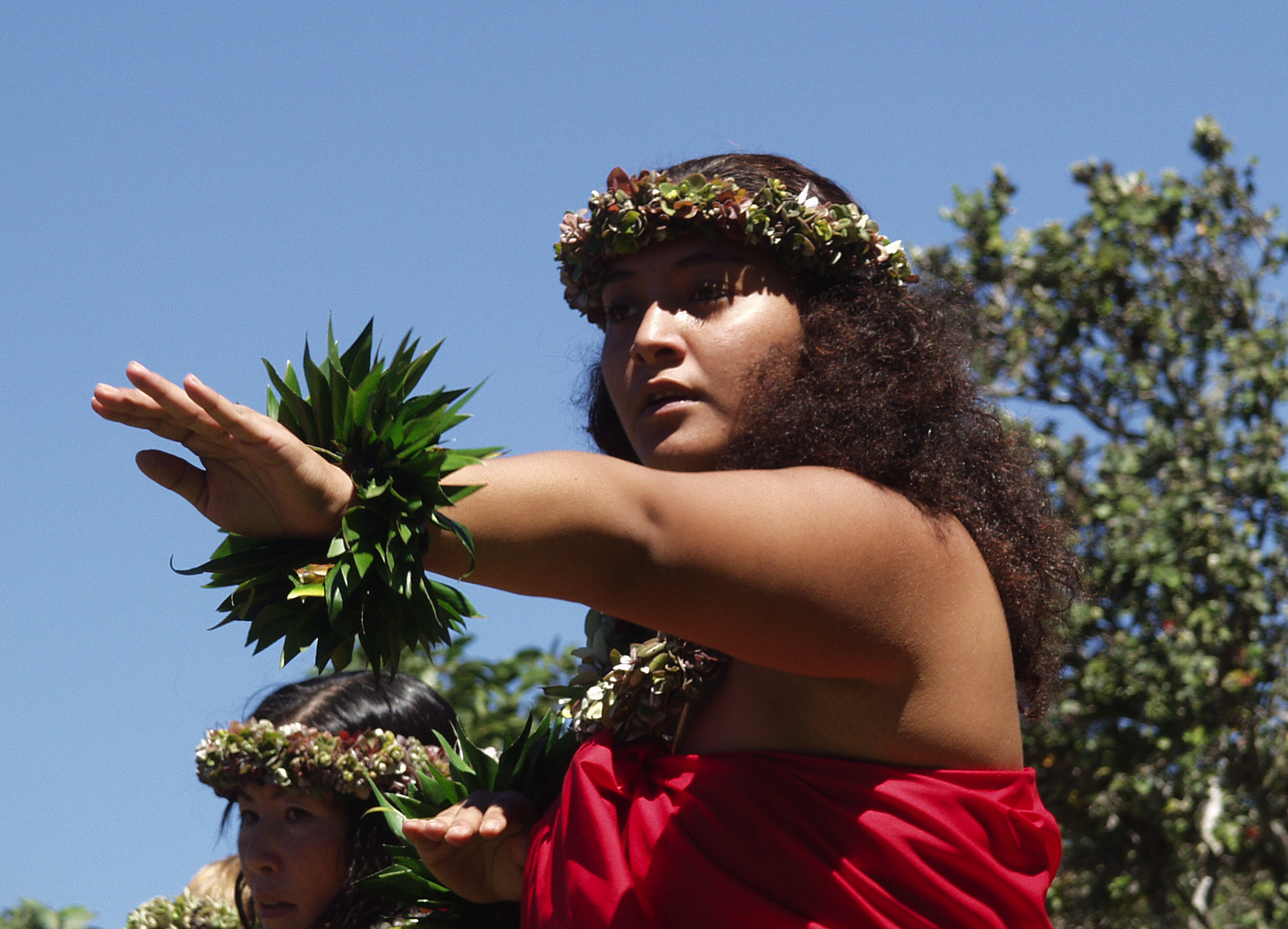
A kanaka maoli (native) from Hawaii performing the hula

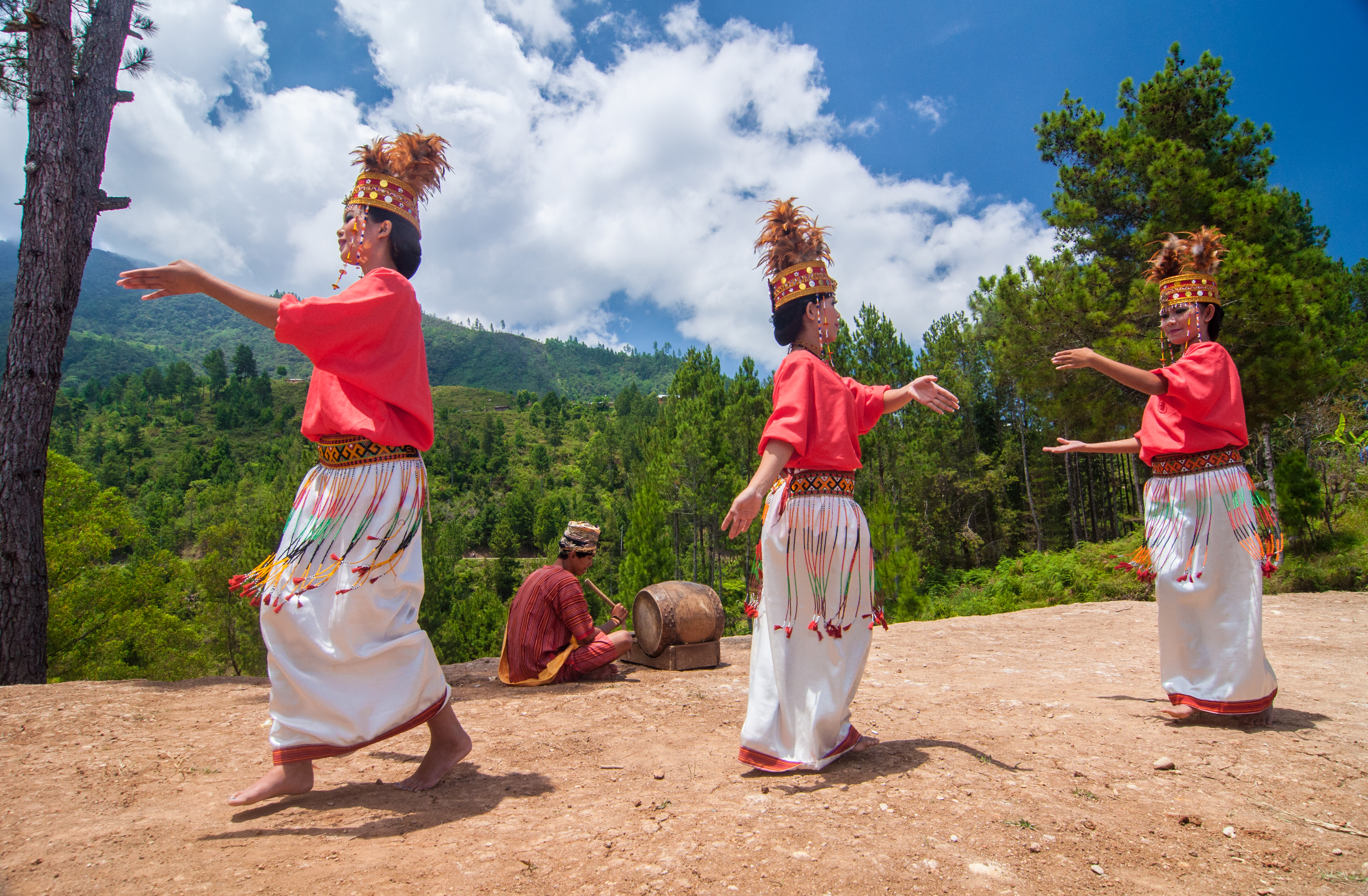
Pagellu dance at a funeral in Tana Toraja people

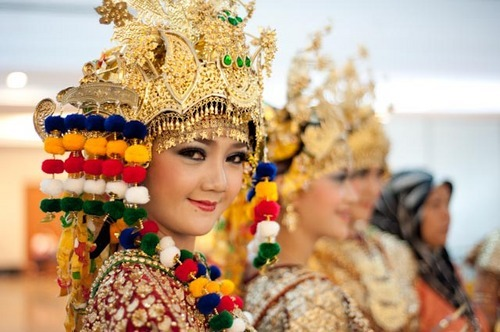
Gending Sriwijaya, traditional dance from Palembangese

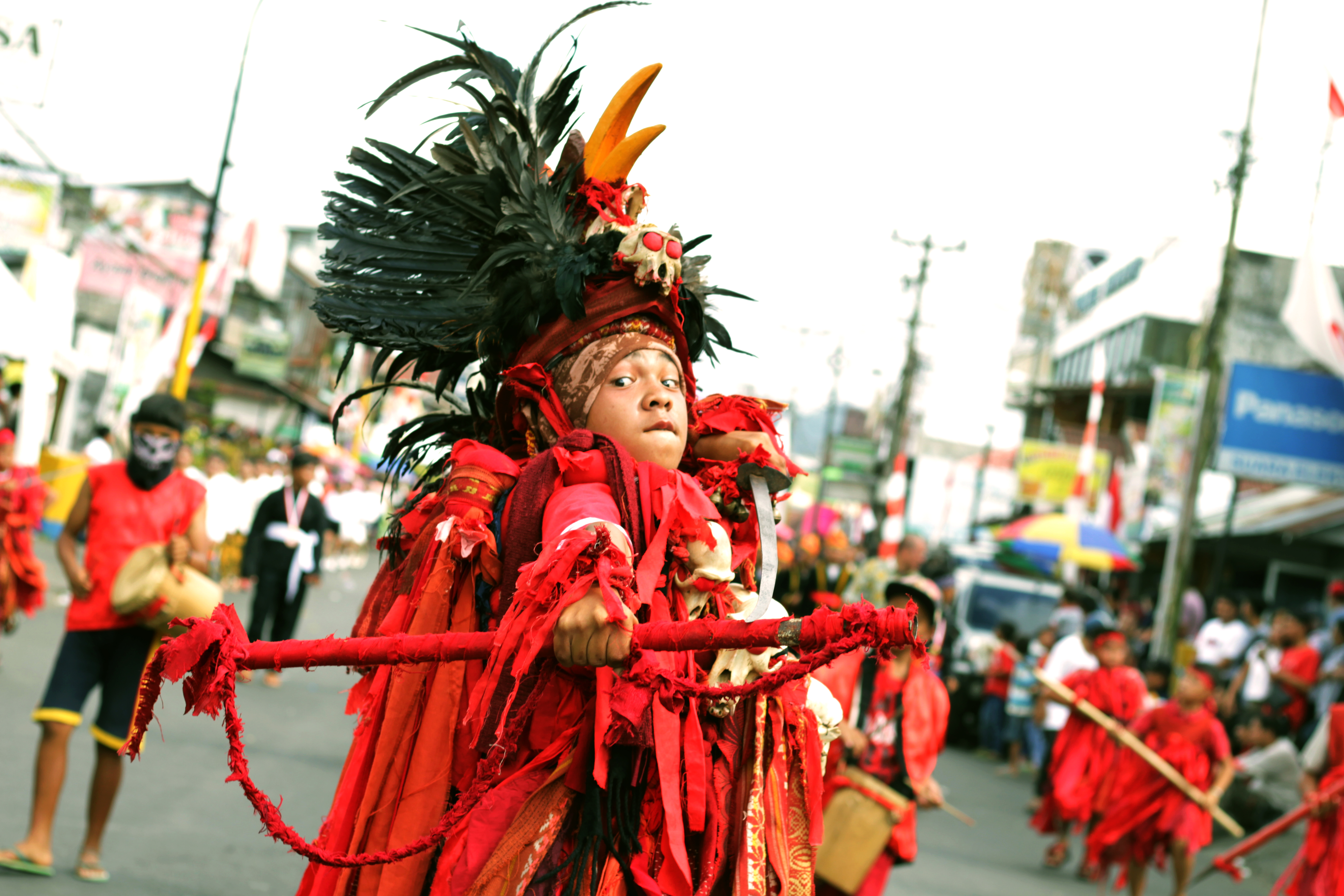
A Kabasaran war dancer from Minahasan

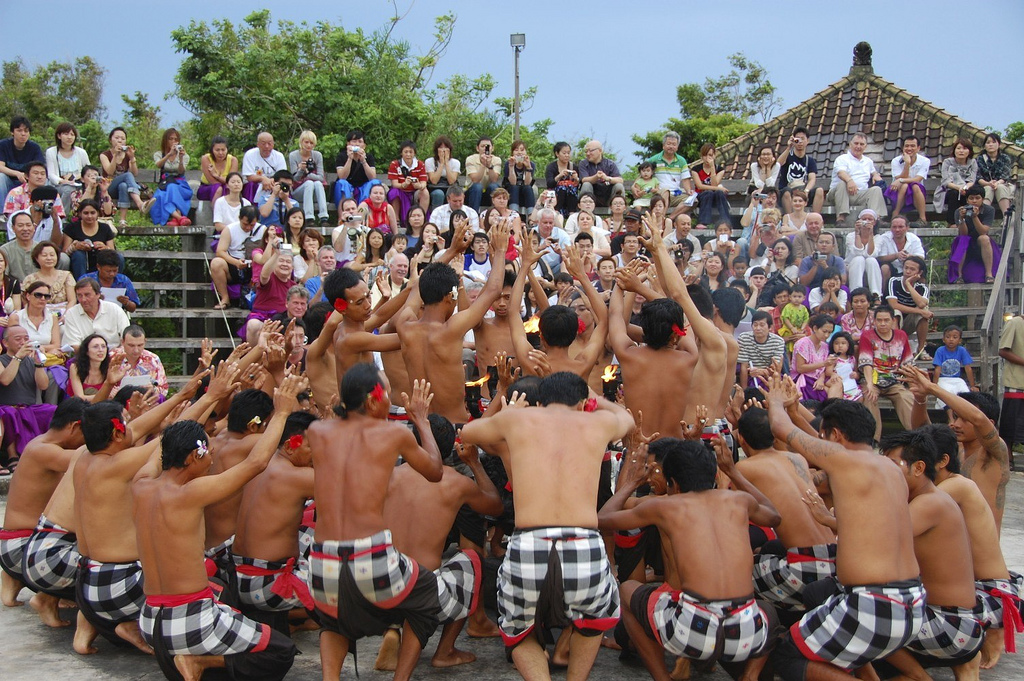
Kecak dancers from Balinese

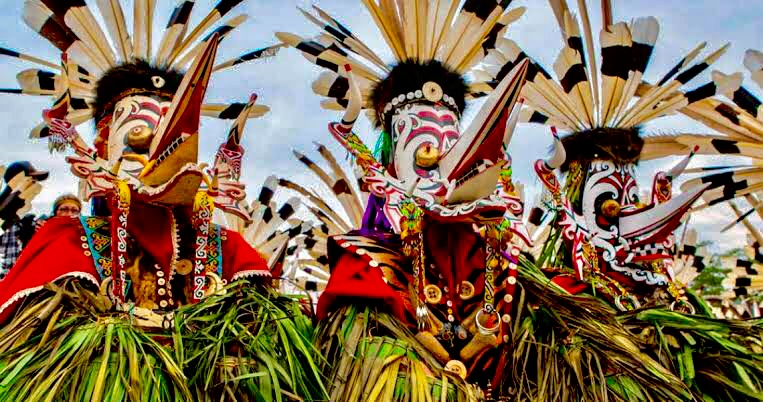
Hudoq, traditional dance from Dayak people

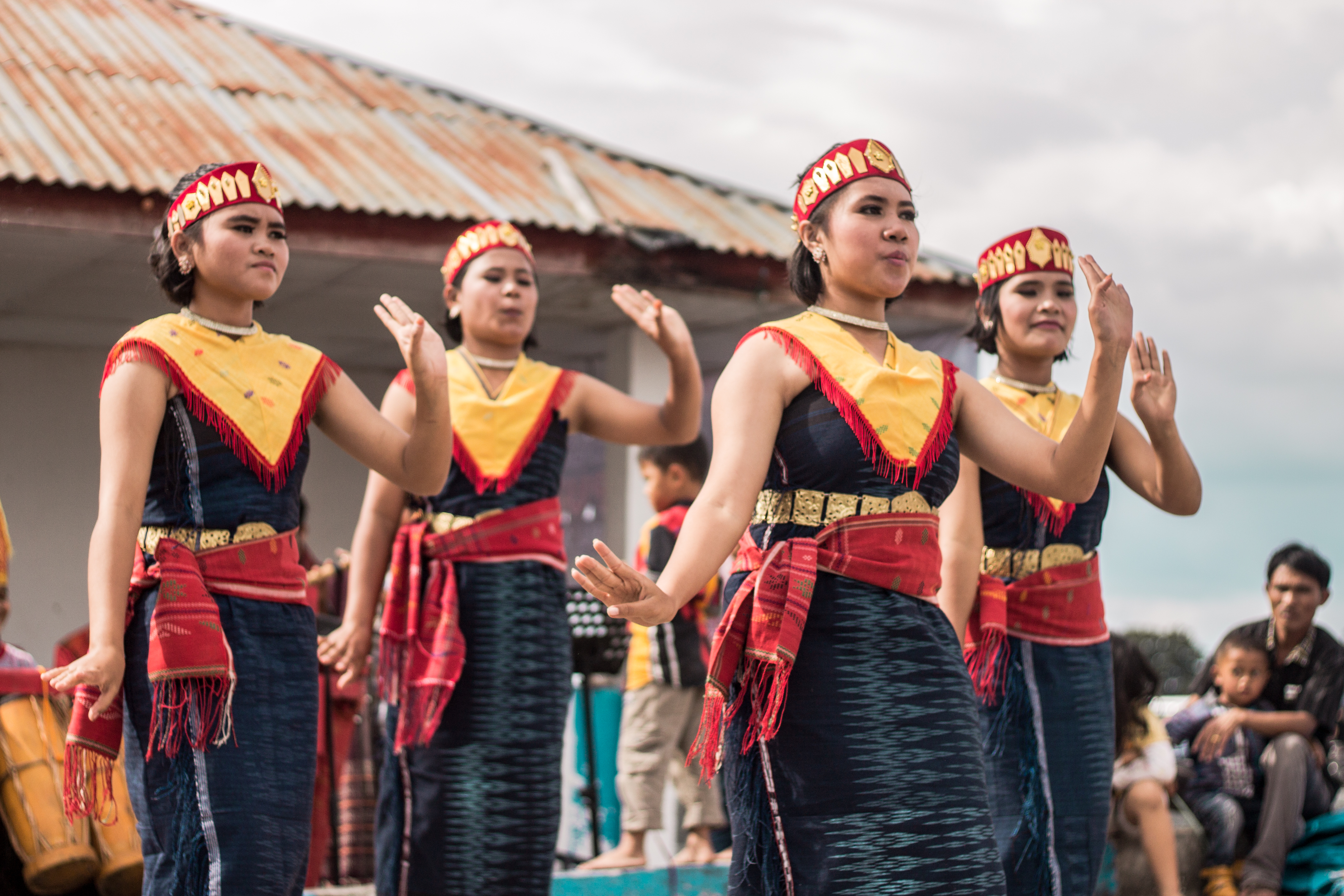
Tortor, traditional dance from Bataks

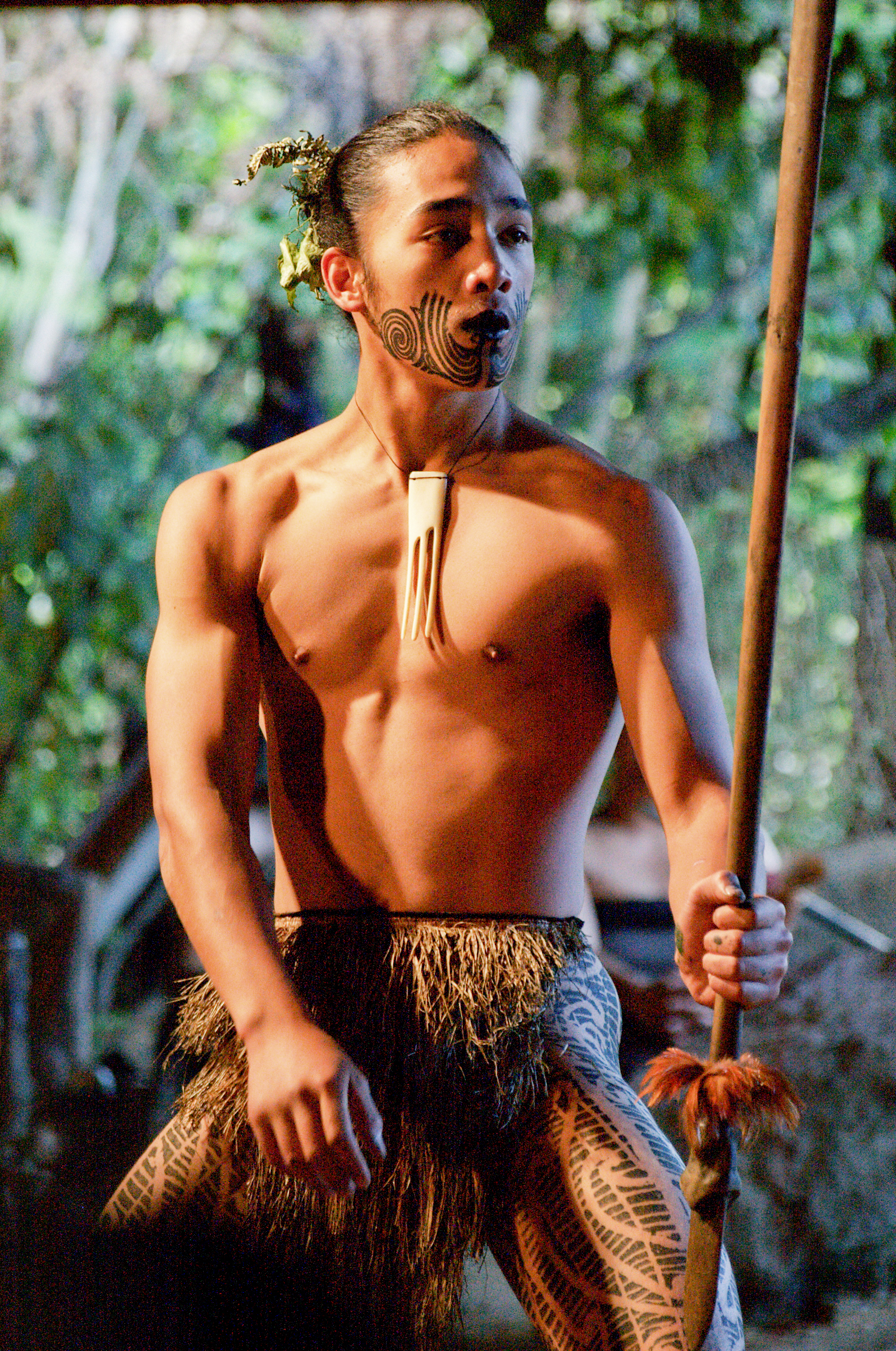
Kapa haka of the Māori people

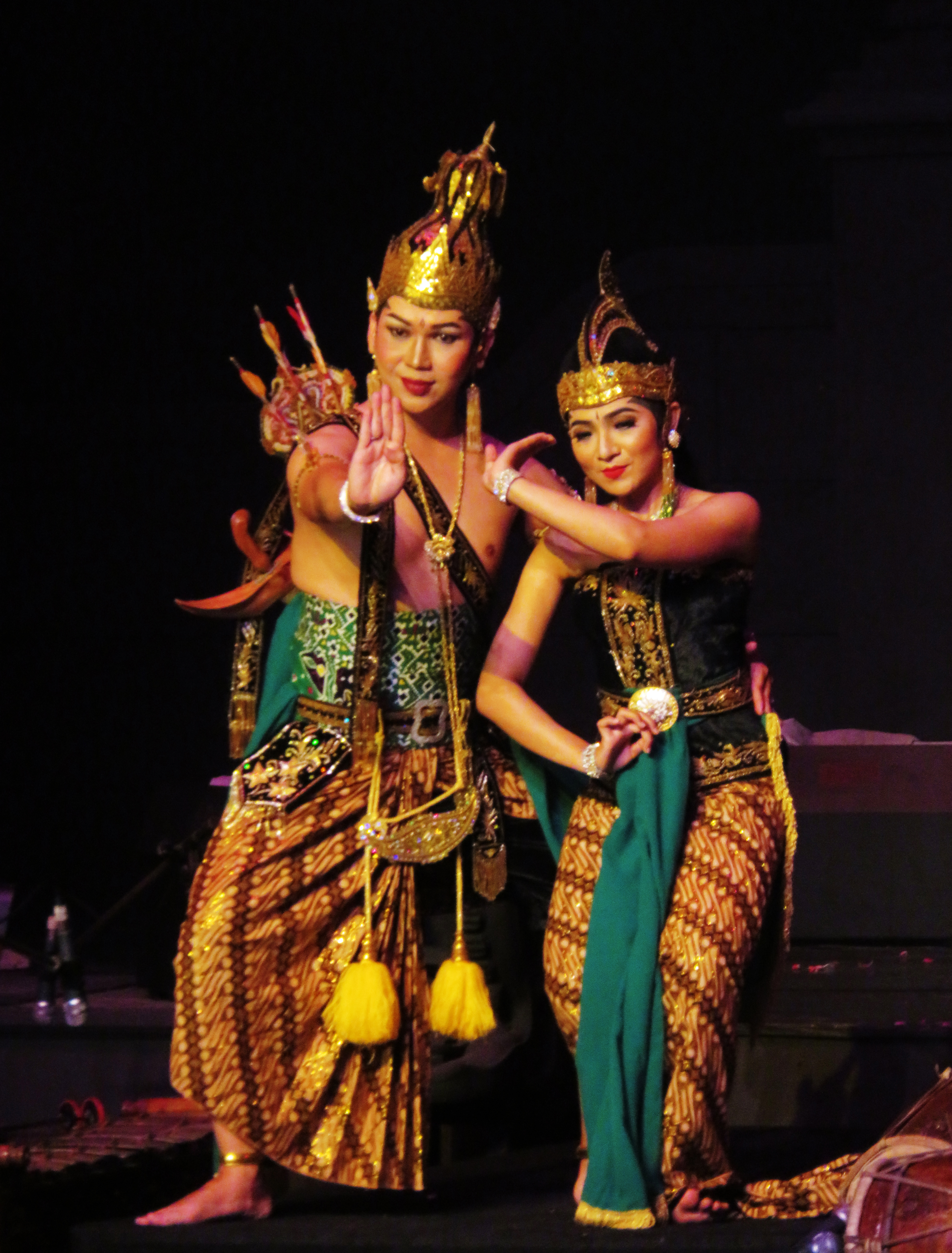
Ramayana Ballet, traditional theater dance from Javanese

=== Jade carving ===
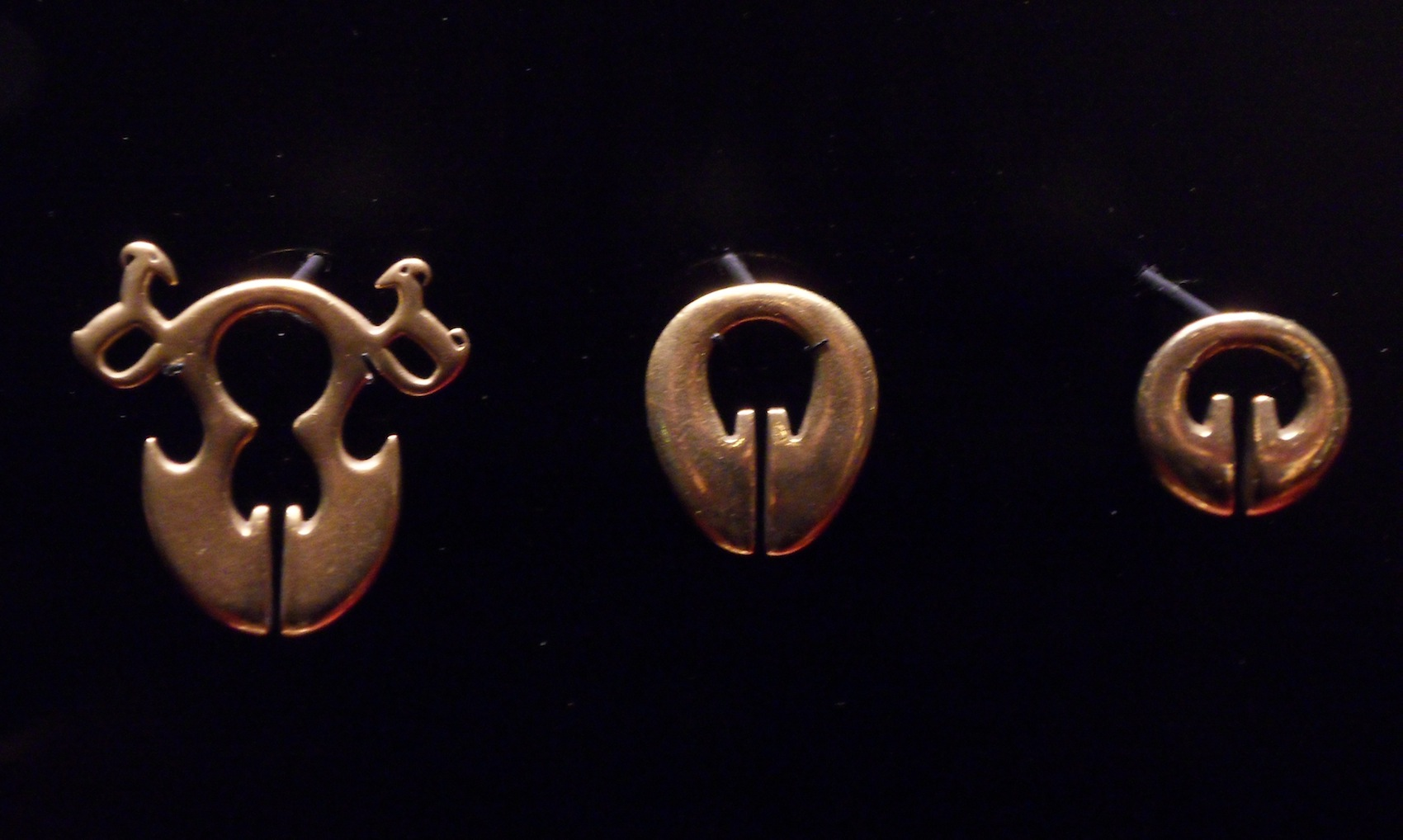
Igorot gold double-headed pendants (lingling-o) from the Philippines

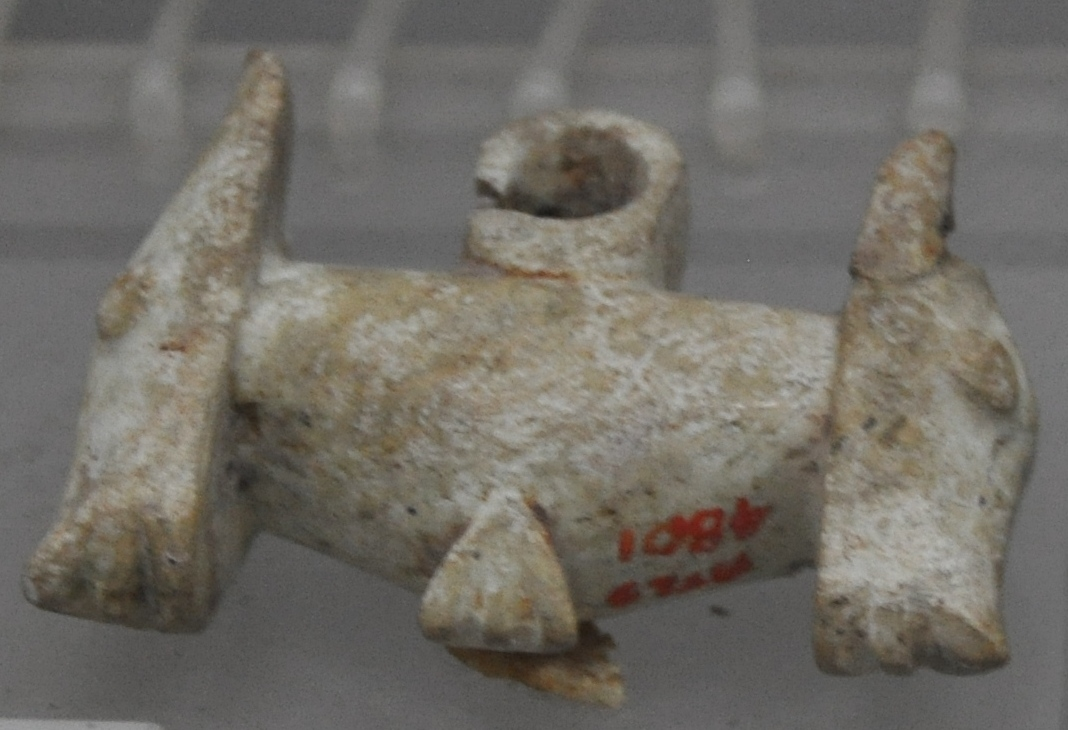
Sa Huỳnh white jade double-headed pendant from Vietnam

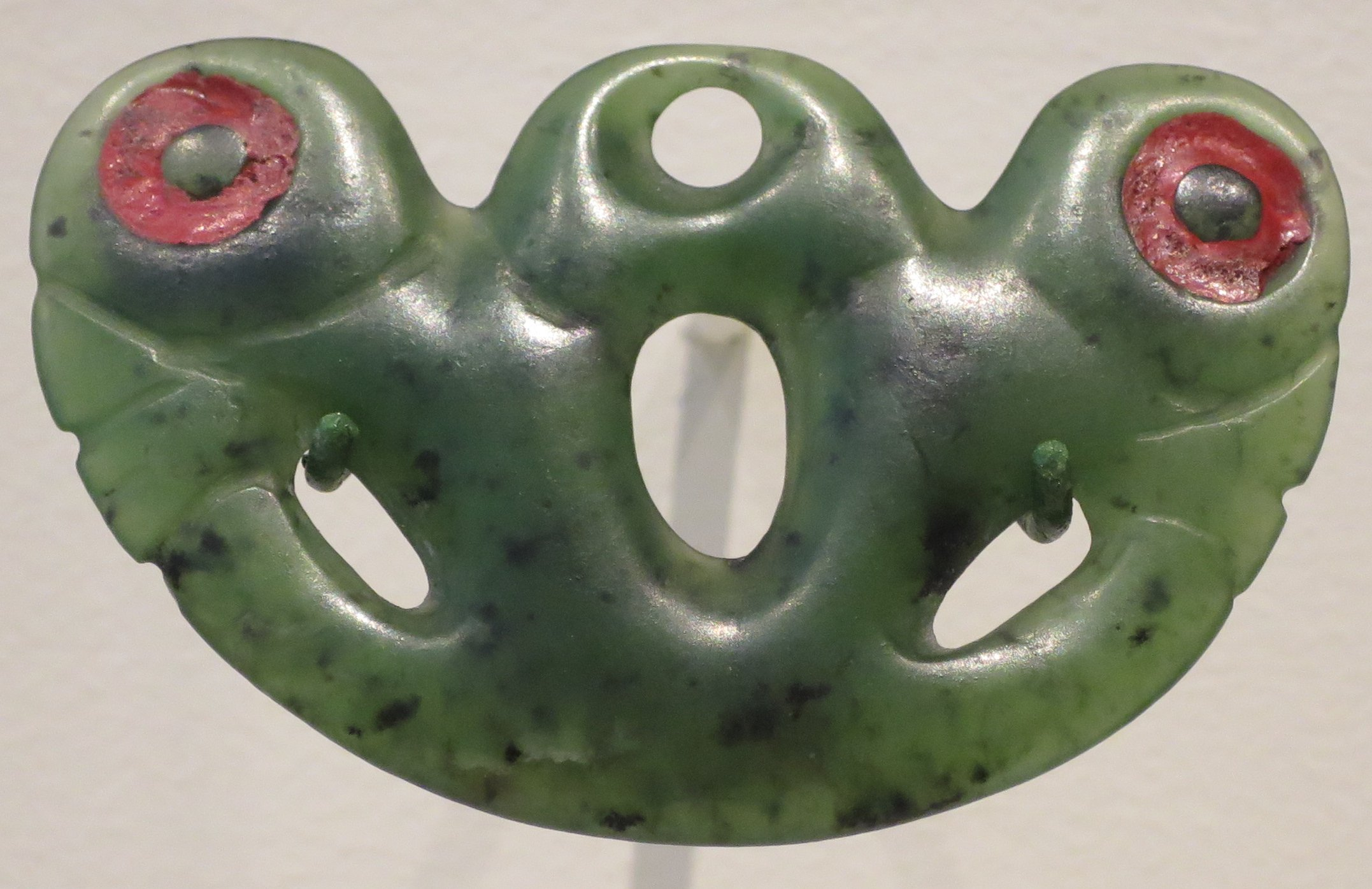
Māori greenstone double-headed pendant (pekapeka) from New Zealand

Māori hei matau jade pendant

The ancestral pre-Austronesian Liangzhu culture (3400–2250 BCE) of the Yangtze River delta was one of the ancient centers of Neolithic jade carving. Jade was spread to Taiwan by around 3,000 BCE, then further into the Philippines at 2,000 BCE and Vietnam at 1,800–1,500 BCE. All of them began to produce various tools and ornaments in indigenous jade workshops, including adzes, bracelets, beads, and rings.

The most notable jade products of these regions were the vast amounts of penannular (in the form of an incomplete circle) and double-headed earrings and pendants known as lingling-o, primarily produced in the Philippines and the Sa Huỳnh culture of Vietnam, mostly with raw jade material sourced from eastern Taiwan. These typically depicted two-headed animals or were ring-shaped with side projections. They were indicative of a very active ancient maritime trading region, known as the Sa Huynh-Kalanay Interaction Sphere, that imported and exported raw jade and finished jade ornaments. They were produced during a period from 500 BCE to as late as 1000 CE, although later examples were replaced with metal, wood, bone, clay, green mica, black nephrite, or shell materials, rather than green jade.

Polished and ground stone adzes, gouges, and other implements, some of which are made from jade-like stone, have also been recorded in areas of Island Melanesia and eastern New Guinea associated with the Lapita culture. These were considered valuable currency and were primarily used to trade for goods. In 2012, a Lapita jadeite gouge used for wood carving was found on Emirau Island in the Bismarck Archipelago. It was dated to around 3,300 BCE, but the origin of the jade material is unknown. Similar stone tools have also been found in New Caledonia.

Jade was absent in most of Remote Oceania, due to the lack of deposits. However, there is putative evidence that Polynesians may have remained familiar with jade and may acquired it through prehistoric trade contacts with New Caledonia, Island Melanesia, and/or New Zealand.

Jade-carving traditions reappeared among the Māori people of New Zealand. These were produced from locally sourced pounamu (greenstone) and were used to produce taonga (treasure). They include various tools and weapons like adzes, scrapers, fishing hooks, and mere, as well as ornaments like the hei-tiki and hei matau. Certain ornaments like the pekapeka (double-headed animal pendant) and the kākā pōria (bird leg ring) bear remarkably strong resemblances to the double-headed and ring-type lingling‑o. Bellwood et al. (2011) has suggested that the reappearance of these motifs might be evidence of a preserved tradition of Southeast Asian jade motifs (perhaps carved in perishable wood, bone, or shell by Polynesians prior to the reacquisition of a jade source), or they might even be the result of later Iron Age contact between eastern Polynesia and the Philippines.

=== Rock art ===
There are approximately six to seven hundred rock art sites discovered in Southeast Asia and Island Melanesia, as well as over eight hundred megalithic sites. The sites specifically associated with the Austronesian expansion contain examples of indigenous pictograms and petroglyphs. Within Southeast Asia, the sites associated with Austronesians can be divided into three general rock art traditions: the Megalithic Culture of Borneo, Sulawesi, and the Greater Sunda Islands; the Austronesian Painting Tradition (APT) of the Lesser Sunda Islands, coastal New Guinea, and Island Melanesia; and the Austronesian Engraving Style (AES) of Papua New Guinea and Island Melanesia. Despite proximity, these traditions can be distinguished readily from the Australo-Melanesian rock art traditions of Australia (except the Torres Strait Islands) as well as the interior highlands of New Guinea, indicating the borders of the extent of the Austronesian expansion.

Dating rock art is difficult, but some of the sites subjected to direct dating pre-date Austronesian arrival, like the Lene Hara paintings of East Timor, which have an age range of 6,300 to 26,000 BP. Conversely, others are more recent and can be dated indirectly by their subjects. The depictions of pottery, ships, and metal objects, for example, put certain rock art sites at a range of 2,000 to 4,000 BP. Some hunter-gatherer groups have also continued to produce rock art well into the present period, as evidenced by their modern subjects.

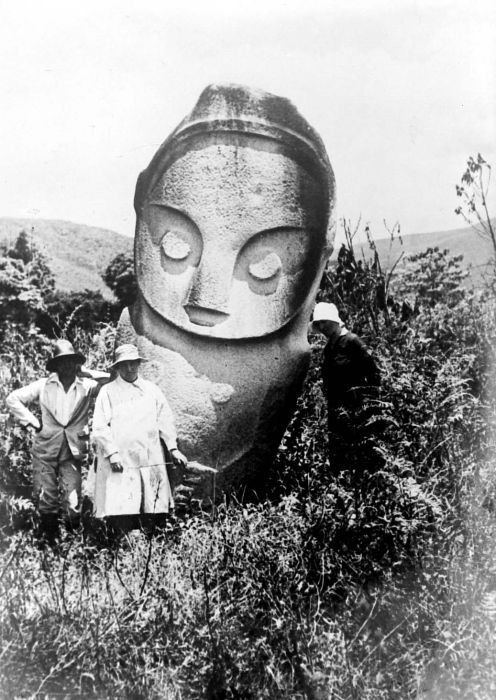
Watu Molindo ("the entertainer stone"), one of the megaliths in Bada Valley, Central Sulawesi, Indonesia, usually found near megalithic stone vats known as kalamba.

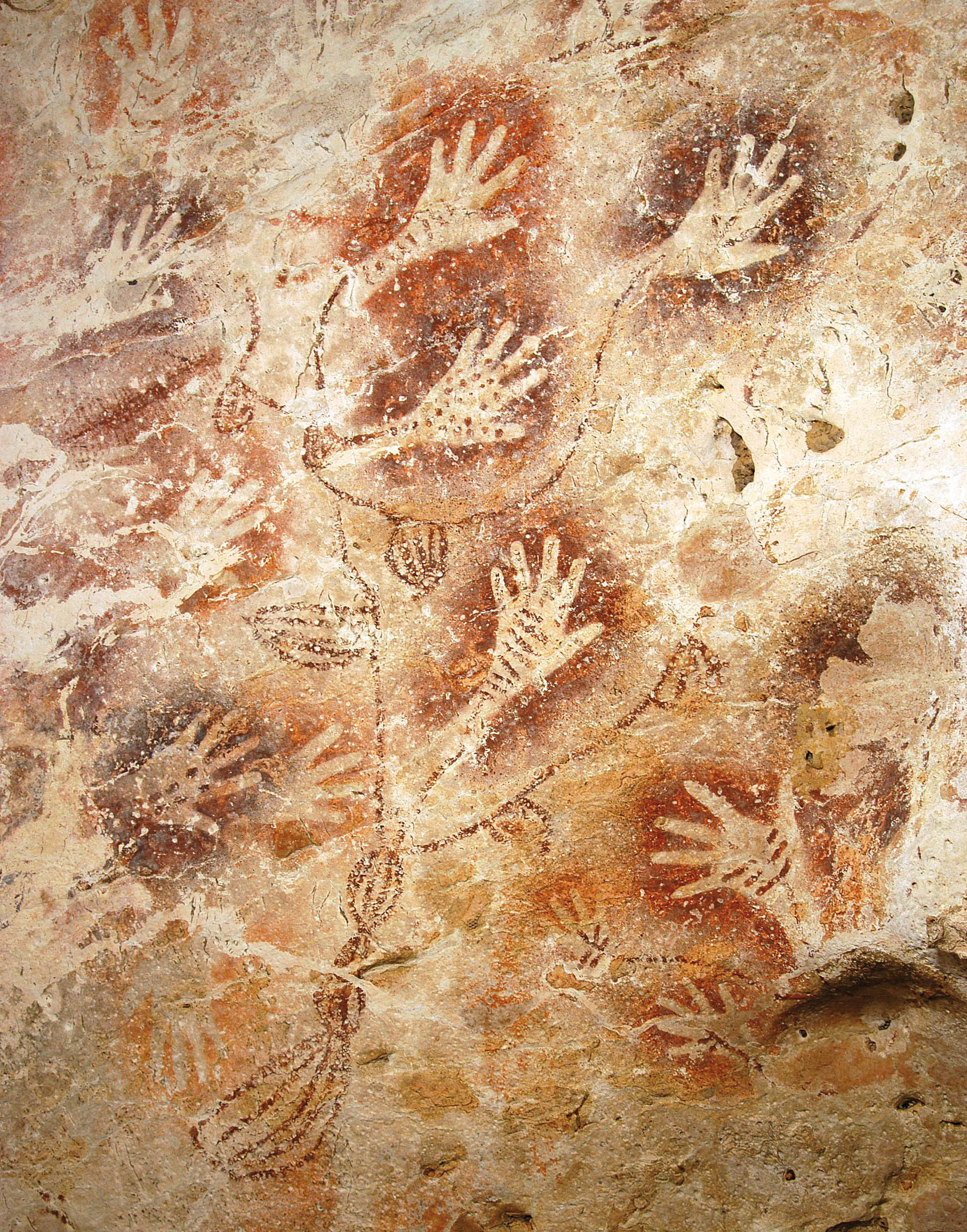
Hand stencils in the "Tree of Life" cave painting in Gua Tewet, Kalimantan, Indonesia

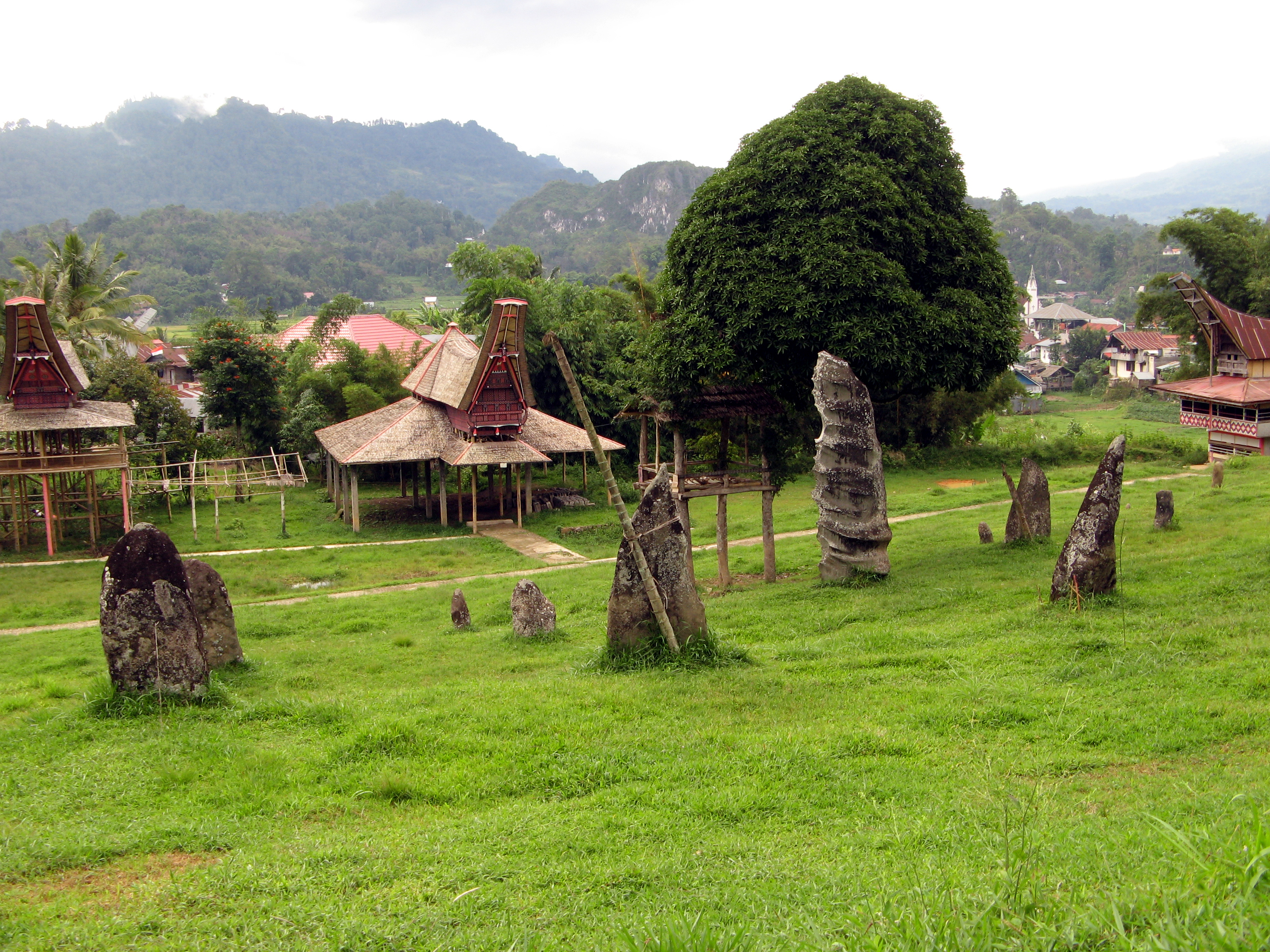
Toraja megaliths memorializing the deceased in Sulawesi, Indonesia

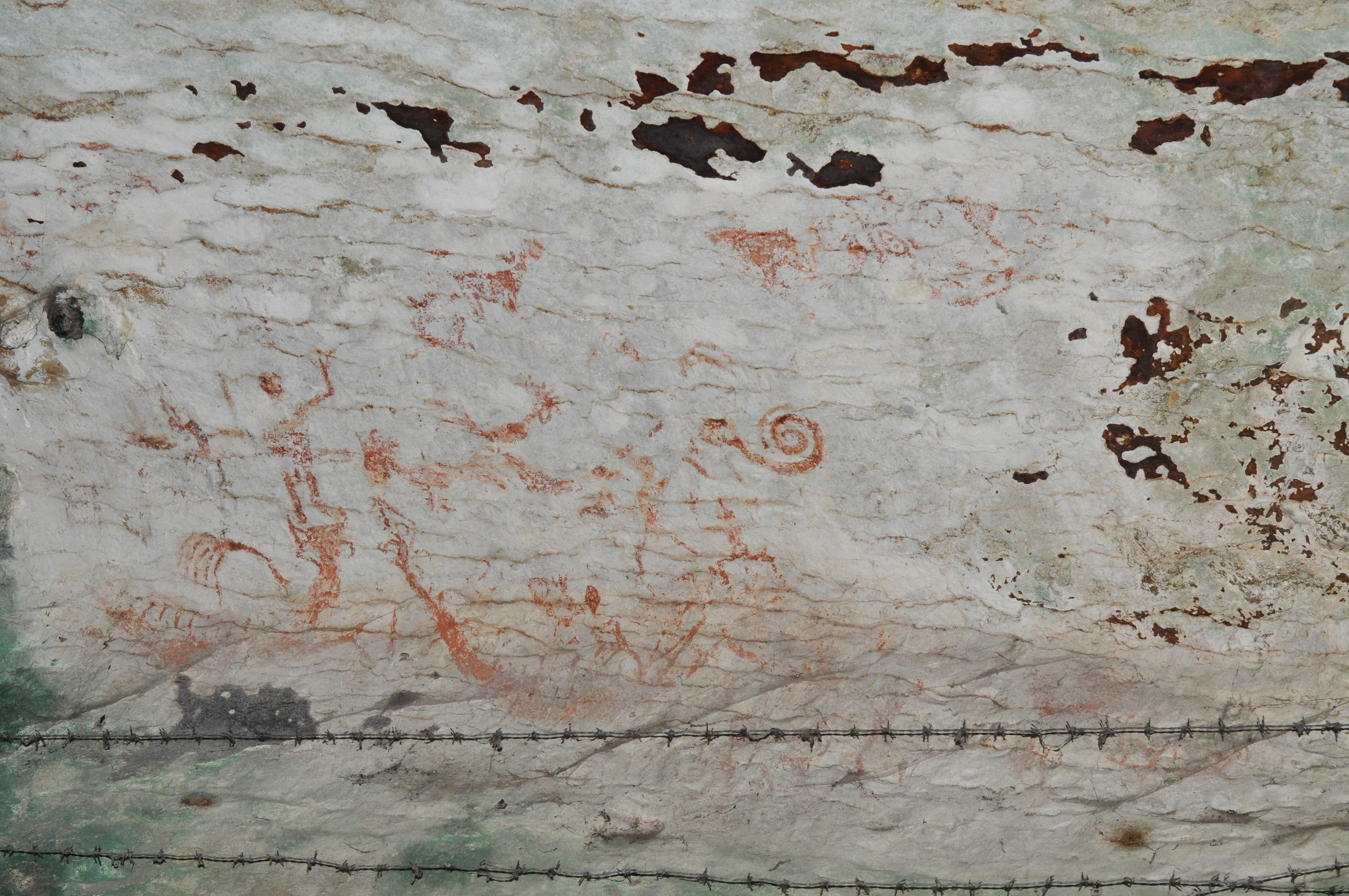
Boats and human figures in a cave painting in the Niah National Park of Sarawak, Malaysia; an example of the Austronesian Painting Traditions

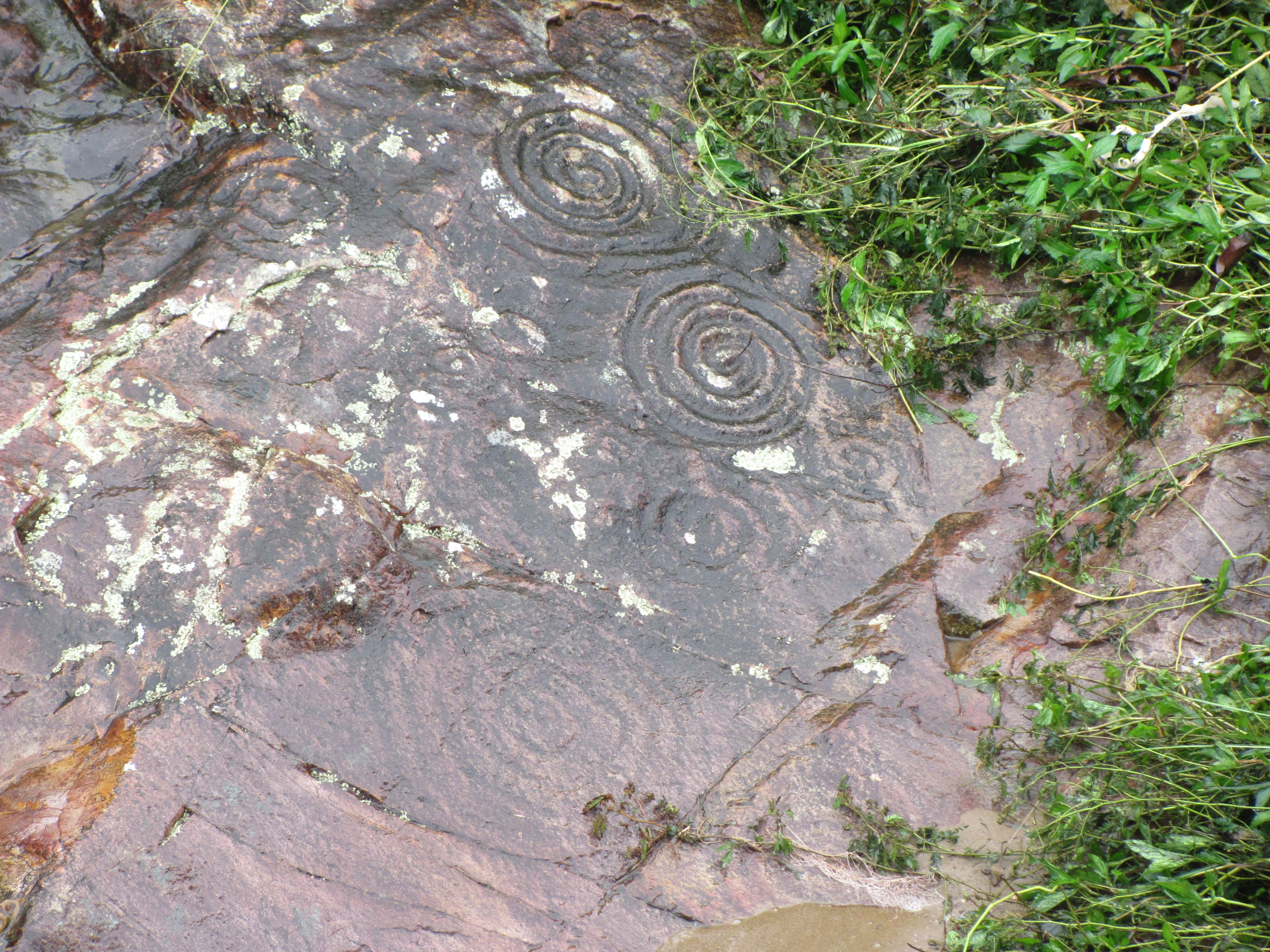
Petroglyphs in Vanuatu, with the concentric circles and swirling designs characteristic of the Austronesian Engraving Style

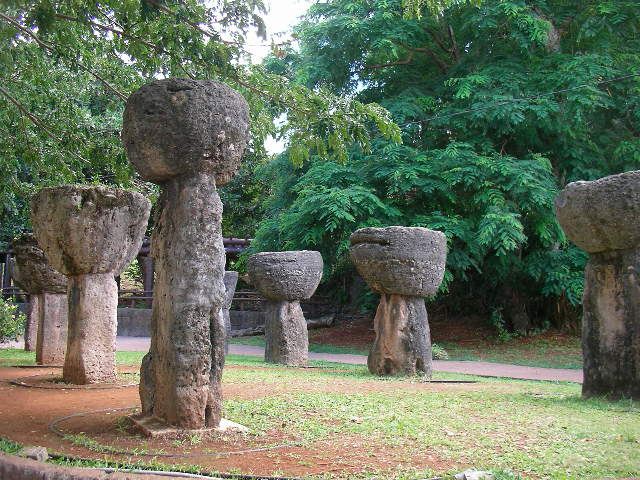
Haligi pillars from the Latte period of Guam. These served as supports for raised buildings.

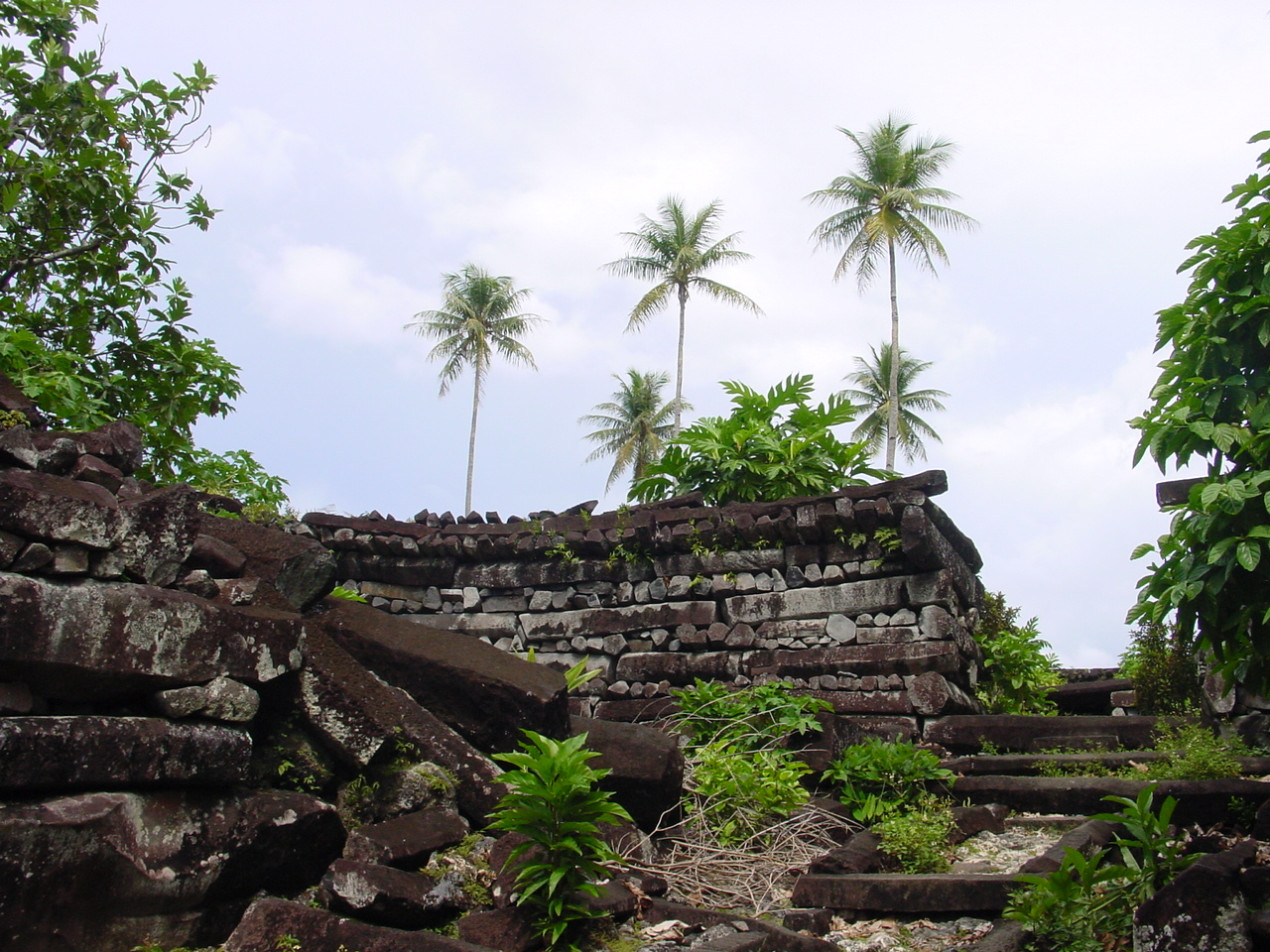
The ruins of Nan Madol, a stone city built on artificial islets in Pohnpei

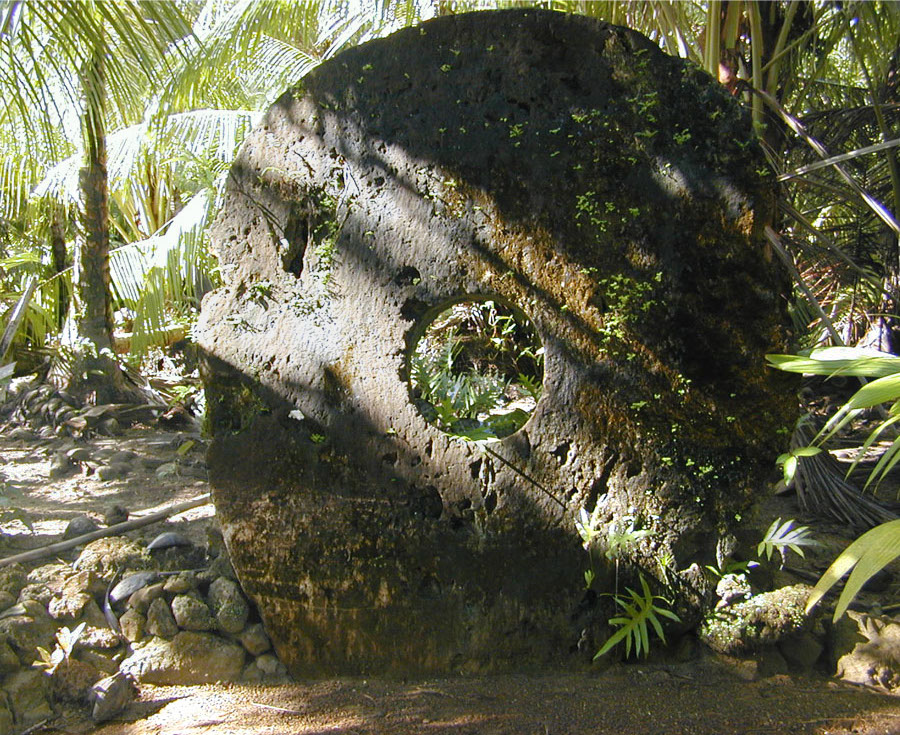
A rai stone, large stone discs used as currency in Yap

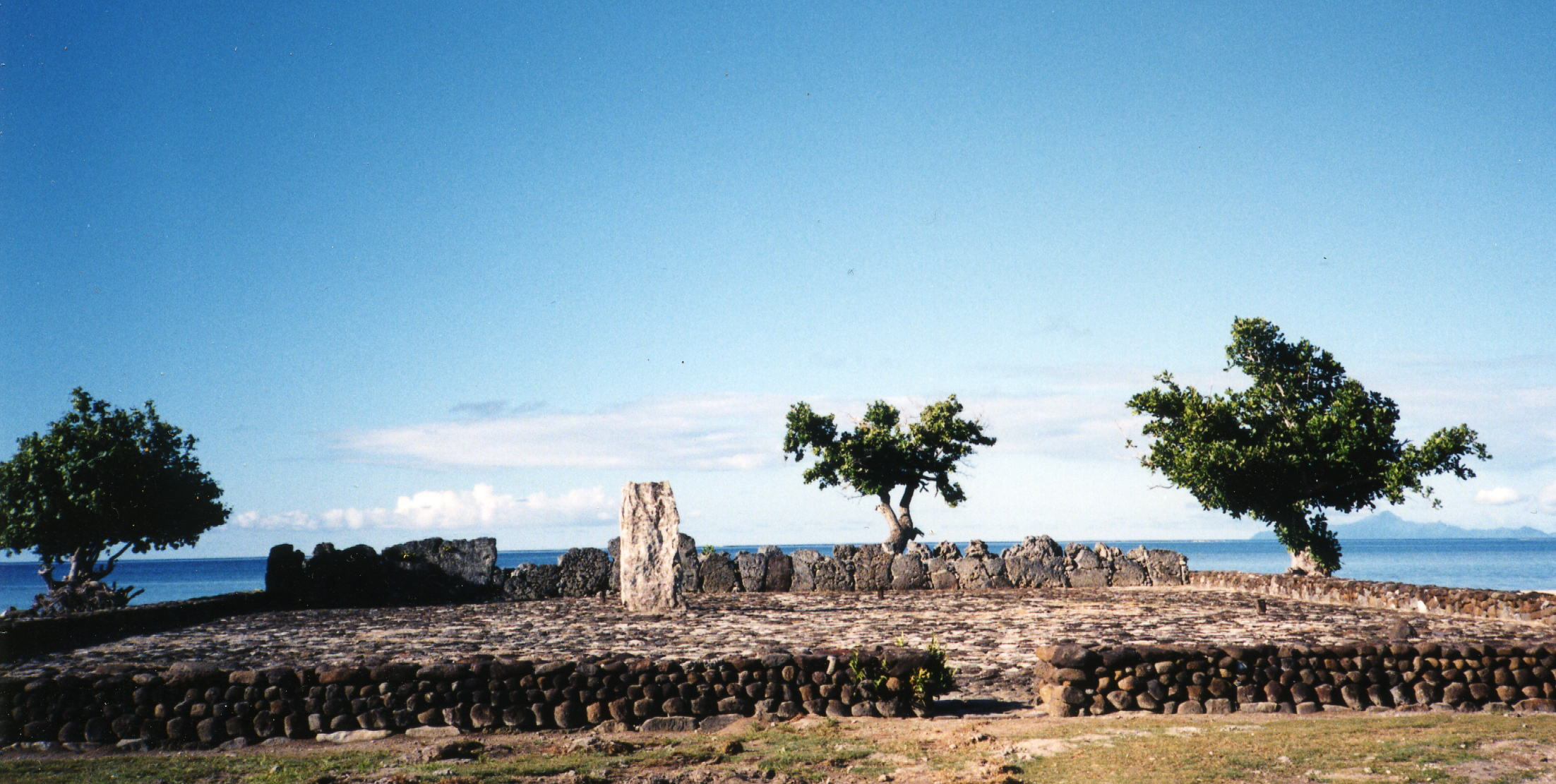
A marae sacred site in Raiatea, French Polynesia

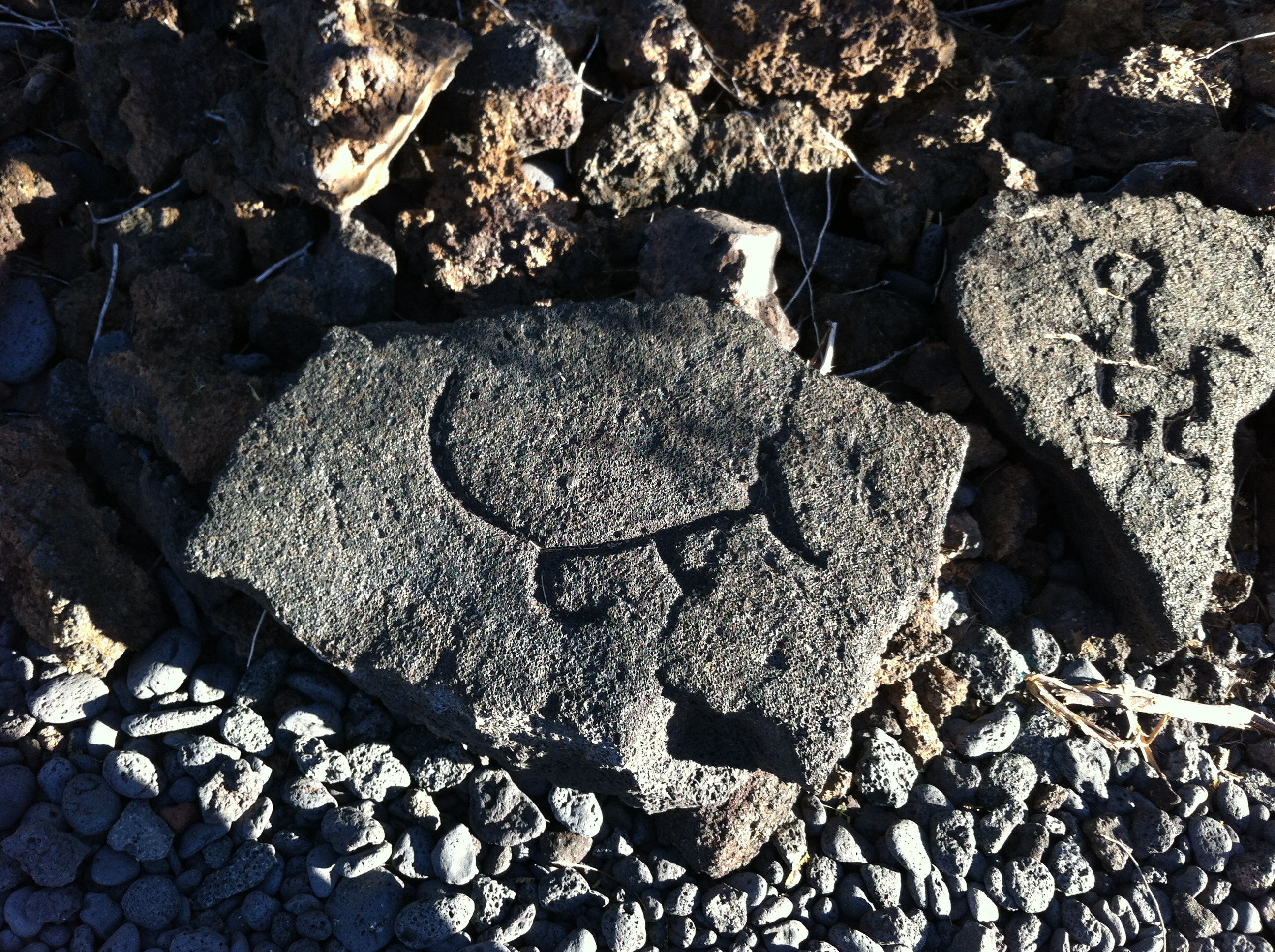
Hawaiian petroglyph depicting a poi dog (ʻīlio)

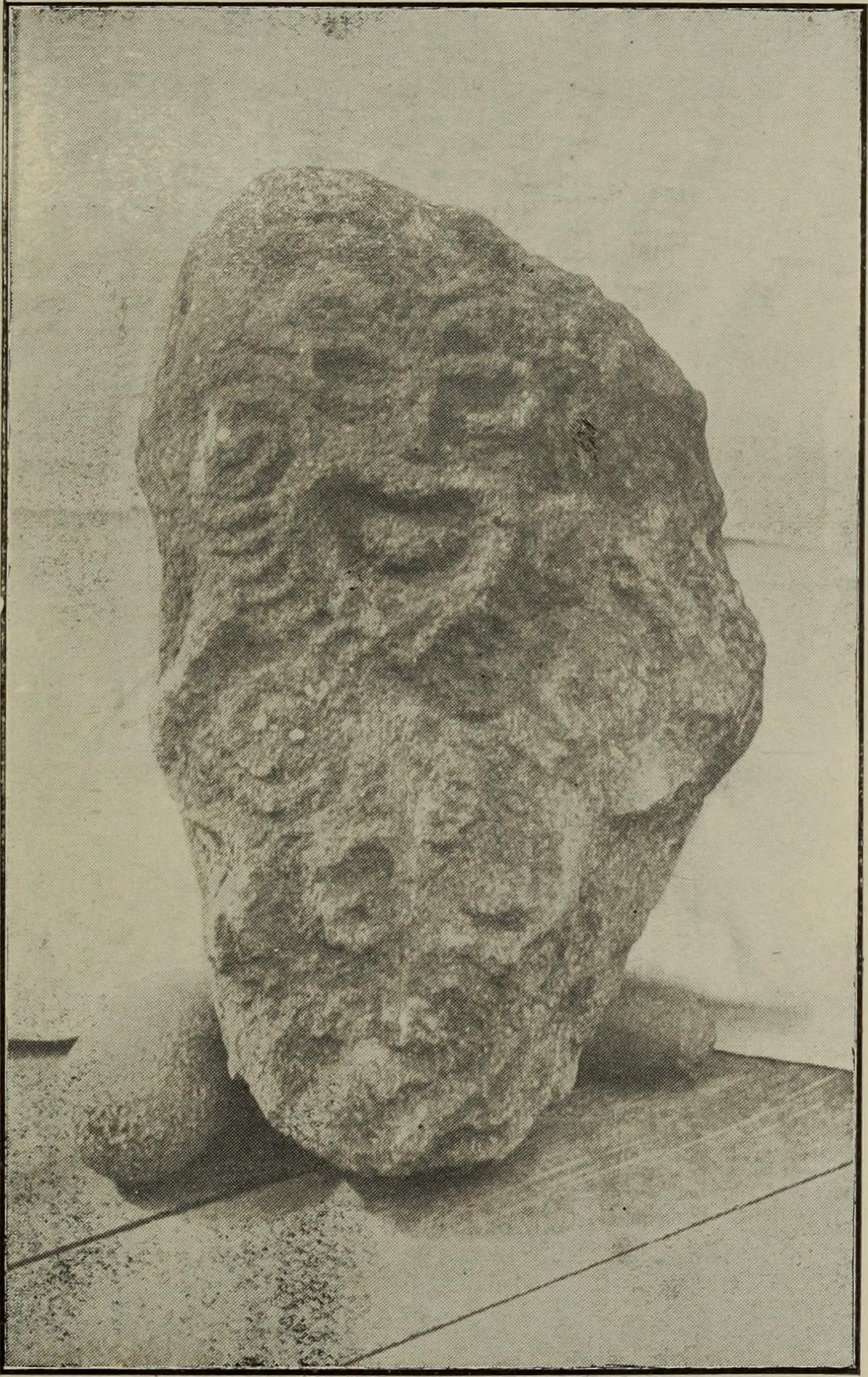
Carving of Rongo, the Māori deity (atua) of kūmara, from Taranaki, North Island, New Zealand

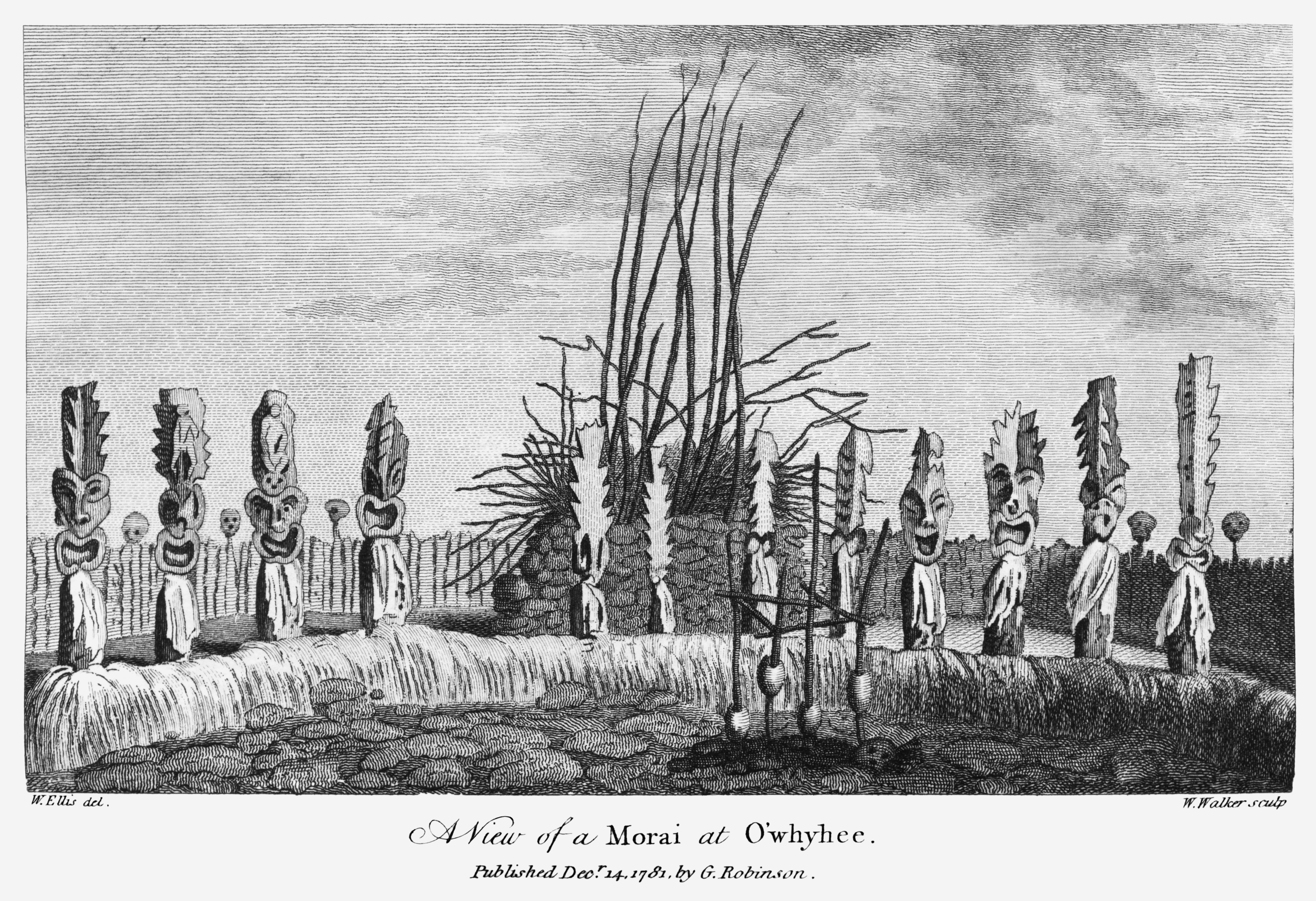
A 1782 illustration of a heiau temple in Hawaii

The Megalithic Culture is mostly limited to western Island Southeast Asia, with the greatest concentration being western Indonesia. While most sites are not dated, the age ranges of dating sites are between the 2nd and 16th centuries CE. They are divided into two phases: The first is an older megalithic tradition associated with the Neolithic Austronesian rectangular axe culture (2,500 to 1,500 BCE), while the second is the 3rd- or 4th-century BCE megalithic tradition associated with the (non-Austronesian) Dong Son culture of Vietnam. Prasetyo (2006) suggests that the megalithic traditions are not originally Austronesian but rather innovations acquired through trade with India and China, but this has little to no evidence in the intervening regions in Thailand, Vietnam, and the Philippines.

The Austronesian Painting Traditions are the most common types of rock art in Island Southeast Asia. They consist of scenes and pictograms typically found in rock shelters and caves near coastal areas. They are characteristically rendered in red ocher pigments for the earlier forms, later sometimes superseded by paintings done in black charcoal pigments. Their sites are mostly clustered in Eastern Indonesia and Island Melanesia, although a few examples can be found in the rest of Island Southeast Asia. Their occurrence has a high correlation to Austronesian-speaking areas, further evidenced by the appearance of bronze artifacts in the paintings. They are mostly found near the coastlines. Their common motifs include hand stencils, "sun-ray" designs, boats, and active human figures with headdresses or weapons and other paraphernalia. They also feature geometric motifs similar to those of the Austronesian Engraving Style. Some paintings are also associated with traces of human burials and funerary rites, including ship burials. The representations of boats themselves are believed to be connected to the widespread "ship of the dead" Austronesian funerary practices.

The earliest APT site dated is from Vanuatu and was found to be around 3,000 BP, corresponding to the initial migration wave of the Austronesians. These early sites are largely characterized by face motifs and hand stencils. Later sites, from 1,500 BP onwards, however, begin to show regional divergence in their art styles. APT can be readily distinguished from older Pleistocene-era Australo-Melanesian cave paintings by their motifs, color, and composition, though they can often be found in the same locality. The most recognizable motifs of APT (like boats) do not occur in cave paintings (or engravings) that definitely pre-date the Austronesian arrival—the sole exception being the stenciled hand motif. Some APT examples are also characteristically found in relatively inaccessible locations, including very high up in cliffsides overlooking the sea. No traces of APT have been found in Taiwan or the Philippines, though there is continuity in the motifs of spirals and concentric circles found in ancestral petroglyphs.

AES, which consists of petroglyphs carved into rock surfaces, is far less common than APT. The majority of these sites are in coastal New Guinea and Island Melanesia. AES sites, which can be tentatively traced back to the similar Wanshan petroglyphs of Taiwan, are believed to be largely correlated to the prehistoric extent of the Lapita culture. The common motif of this tradition is curvilinear geometric engravings like spirals, concentric circles, and face-like forms. These resemble the geometric motifs in APT, though they are considered to be two separate artistic traditions. AES is particularly dominant in the Solomon Islands and New Caledonia, where engravings are far more abundant than painted sites.

O'Connor et al. (2015) proposes that APT developed during the initial rapid southward Austronesian expansion, and not before, possibly as a response to the communication challenges brought about by the new maritime mode of living. Along with AES, these material symbols and associated rituals and technologies may have been manifestations of "powerful ideologies" spread by Austronesian settlers that were central to the "Neolithization" and rapid assimilation of the various non-Austronesian indigenous populations of ISEA and Melanesia.

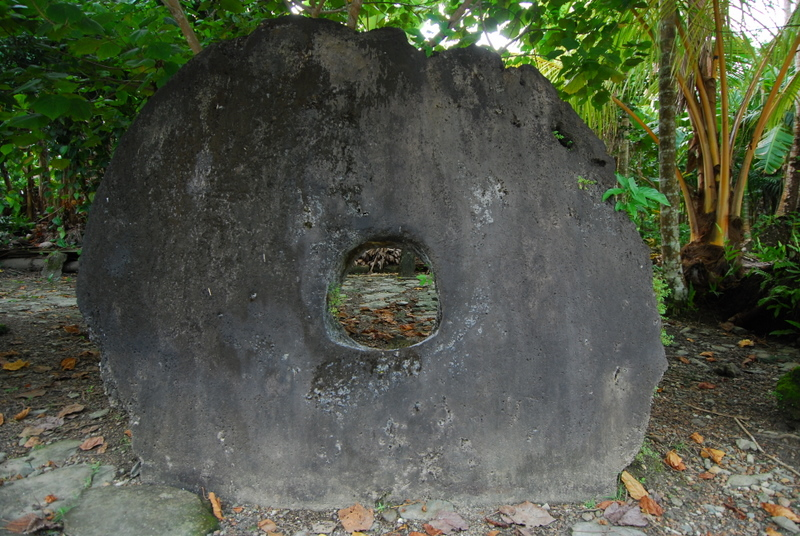
Rai stones from the Yap islands, Micronesia

The easternmost islands of Island Melanesia (Vanuatu, Fiji, and New Caledonia) are considered part of Remote Oceania, as they are beyond the inter-island visibility threshold. These island groups begin to show divergence from the APT and AES traditions of Near Oceania. While their art traditions show a clear continuation of the APT and AES traditions, they also feature innovations unique to each island group, like the increasing use of black charcoal, rectilinear motifs, and being more commonly found inside sacred caves rather than on open cliffsides.

In Micronesia, the rock art traditions can be divided into three general regions: western, central, and eastern. The divisions reflect the various major migration waves from the Philippines into the Mariana Islands and Palau in 3,500 BP; a Lapita culture back-migration from Island Melanesia into central and eastern Micronesia around 2,200 BP; and finally, a back-migration from western Polynesia into eastern Micronesia around 1,000 BP.

In western Micronesia (Palau, Yap, Guam, and the Northern Mariana Islands), rock art primarily consists of paintings on high cave ceilings and sea-facing cliffs. It is very similar to APT in terms of its motifs as well as its placement in relatively inaccessible locations. Common motifs include hand stencils, faces, turtles and fish, concentric circles, and characteristic four-pointed stars. Petroglyphs are rare and mainly consist of human forms with triangular bodies without heads or arms. This is believed to be connected to the funerary rite of removing the heads from the bodies of deceased relatives. A notable megalithic tradition in western Micronesia are the haligi stone pillars of the Chamorro people. These are capped stone pillars that are believed to have served as supports for raised buildings. They are associated with the Latte period (900 to 1700 CE), when a new wave of migrants from Southeast Asia reintroduced rice cultivation to the islands. Another megalithic tradition is that of the rai stones, massive doughnut-shaped discs of rock that were used as currency on Yap.

Rock art in central Micronesia (Chuuk, Pohnpei, and Kosrae), in contrast, is dominated by rock engravings with motifs tying it to the rock art traditions of Island Melanesia. They include curvilinear shapes like spirals and concentric circles, tree-like shapes, and the distinctive "enveloped cross" motif. The Pohnpaid petroglyphs are the largest assemblage of rock engravings in the region, with motifs dominated by footprints, enveloped crosses, and outlined "sword-paddles". Central Micronesia also hosts the ruins of the stone cities of Nan Madol (1,180–1,200 CE) and Leluh (1,200–1,800 CE), on the islands of Pohnpei and Kosrae, respectively.

In the low-lying atolls of eastern Micronesia, rock art is rare-to-nonexistent, due to the absence of suitable rock surfaces for painting or engraving.

In Polynesia, rock art is dominated by petroglyphs, rather than paintings, and they show less variation than the rock art of Near Oceania and ISEA. In the western Polynesian islands nearest to Island Melanesia, rock art is rare (like in Tonga and Samoa) or absent entirely (like in the Cook Islands). However, petroglyphs are abundant on the islands in the further reaches of the Polynesian triangle, particularly on Hawaii, the Marquesas, and Rapa Nui. Rapa Nui has the densest concentration of engravings in Polynesia as a whole, while the Puʻuloa petroglyphs site on Hawaii has the largest number of petroglyphs in a single site, at over 21,000 engravings. Polynesia also features megalithic sacred ceremonial centers generally known as marae.

On Tonga and Samoa, the existing rock art sites consist mostly of engravings with motifs including curvilinear shapes, human figures, "jellyfish", turtles, birds, and footprints. These are typically carved in natural rock formations or marae sites.

In the central-eastern Polynesian islands, which include the Marquesas and the Society Islands, petroglyphs are more numerous. They show the archetypal Polynesian motifs of turtles, faces, cup-like depressions (cupules), stick-like human figures, boats, fish, curvilinear shapes, and concentric circles. Like in western Polynesia, they are typically carved into marae sites or in rocks beside streams. The existing rock paintings also display the same motifs but are rendered in different styles.

On the Hawaiian islands, the abundant petroglyphs are remarkably all similar in execution. Their common subjects include stick-like human figures, dogs, boats, sails, paddles, footprints, and ceremonial headdresses. Depictions of marine life, however, are rare, unlike in the rest of Polynesia. They are typically carved into boulders, lava rock formations, and cliffsides. Red paintings of dogs on cliffsides and caves can also be found on Kauʻai and Maui. The megalithic traditions of Hawaii can be exemplified by the heiau sacred sites, which can range from simple earth terraces to standing stones.

On Rapa Nui, the engravings are distinctive but still show similarities to the techniques and motifs of the Marquesas. Their motifs commonly include disembodied parts of the human body (vulvae in particular), animals, plants, ceremonial objects, and boats. A prominent motif is also that of the "birdman" figure, which is associated with the tangata manu cult of Makemake. The best-known rock art assemblage of Rapa Nui, however, are the moai megaliths. A few paintings, mostly of birds and boats, have also been discovered, which are associated with the engravings, rather than being separate artforms.

The rock art in New Zealand can be divided into two regions. North Island features more engravings than paintings, while South Island is unique in that it is the only Polynesian island where there are more paintings than engravings. New Zealand rock paintings are done in red and black pigments and can sometimes be found at inaccessible heights. They typically depict human figures (particularly a front-facing human figure with flexed arms), birds, lizards, dogs, fish, and what has been identified as "birdmen". Engravings in open spaces like cliffsides are generally of spirals and curvilinear shapes, while engravings in enclosed caves and shelters depict faces and boats. The same motifs can also be seen in dendroglyphs on living trees.

=== Body art ===
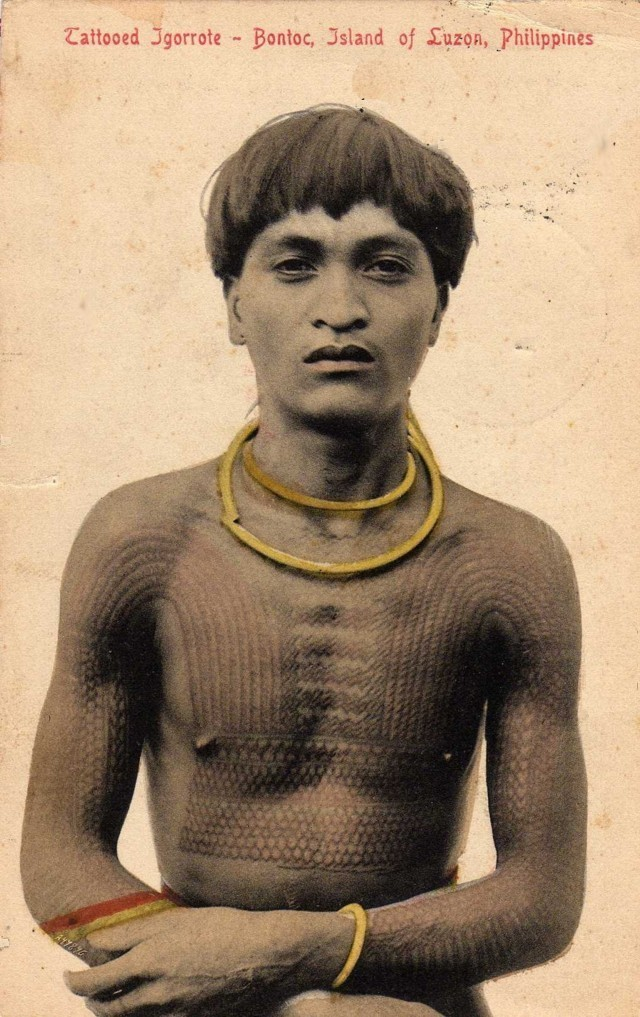
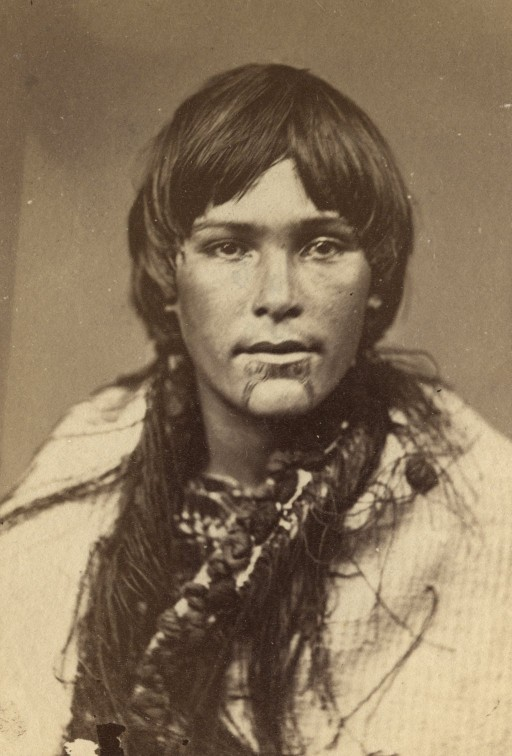
Left: A young Bontoc man from the Philippines (c. 1908) with tattoos on the chest and arms (chaklag). These indicate that the man was a warrior who had taken heads during battle.
Right: A young Māori woman with traditional tattoos (moko) on the lips and chin (c. 1860–1879). These were symbols of status and rank as well as being considered marks of beauty. She is probably of Mixed-white ancestry common amongst Maori people, because of her caucasian facial features.

Body art among Austronesian peoples is common, especially elaborate tattooing, which is one of the most well-known pan-Austronesian traditions.

==== Tattooing ====
In modern times, tattoos are usually associated with Polynesian culture, due to the highly influential accounts of James Cook in his explorations of the Pacific in the 18th century. Cook introduced the word "tattoo" (archaic: "tattaow", "tattow") into the English vocabulary from Tahitian and Samoan tātau ("to tap"). However, tattoos existed prominently in various other Austronesian groups prior to contact with other cultures.

Tattoos had various functions among Austronesian societies. Among men, they were strongly linked to the widespread practice of head-hunting raids. In head-hunting societies, tattoos were records of how many heads the warrior had taken in battle, and they were part of the initiation rites into adulthood. The number and location of tattoos, therefore, were indicative of a warrior's status and prowess.

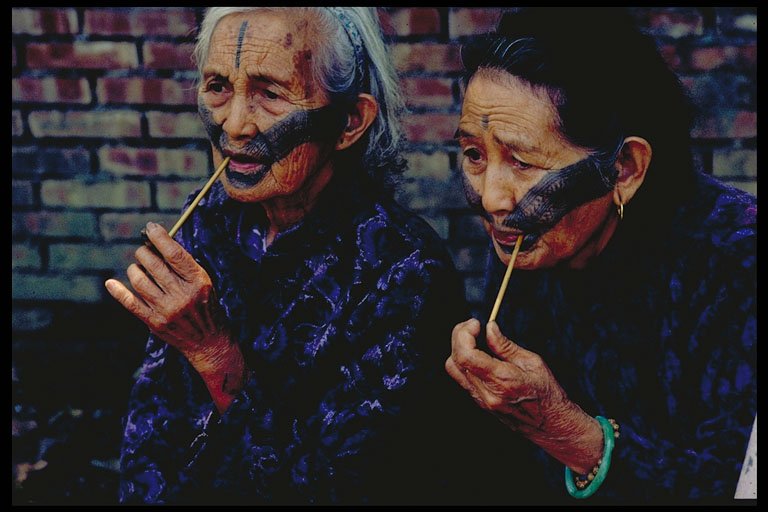
Elder Atayal women from Taiwan, with facial tattoos

Among the Indigenous Taiwanese, tattoos were present for both men and women. Among the Atayal, facial tattoos were dominant. They indicated maturity and skill in weaving and farming for women and skill in hunting and battle for men. As in most of Austronesia, tattooing traditions in Taiwan have largely disappeared due to the Sinicization of native peoples after the Chinese colonization of the island in the 17th century, as well as conversion to Christianity. Most of the remaining tattoos are only found among elders.

One of the earliest descriptions of Austronesian tattoos by Europeans was during the 16th-century Spanish expeditions to the Philippines, beginning with the first voyage of circumnavigation by Ferdinand Magellan. The Spanish encountered the heavily tattooed Visayan people in the Visayas Islands, whom they named the Pintados (Spanish for "the painted ones"). However, Philippine tattooing traditions (batok) have mostly been lost as the natives of the islands converted to Christianity and Islam, though they are still practiced in isolated groups in the highlands of Luzon and Mindanao. Philippine tattoos were usually geometric patterns or stylized depictions of animals, plants, and human figures. Some of the few remaining traditional tattoos in the Philippines are among elders of the Igorot peoples. Most of these were records of war exploits against the Japanese during World War II.

Among the Māori of New Zealand, tattoos (moko) were originally carved into the skin using bone chisels (uhi) rather than through puncturing, as in usual practice. In addition to being pigmented, the skin was also left raised into ridges of swirling patterns.

Among the Javanese, the "tattos" apparently has been shifted from skin to fabric. This shift produced the famous traditional Indonesian resist-dyeing technique by wax to create patterns on fabric known as batik. While resist-dyeing technique can be found across many cultural traditions, the canting as wax applicator is uniquely Indonesian craft tradition. Similar to the tattos, batik motifs had symbolic meaning and prescribed use, indicating a person's level in society.

==== Dental modification ====
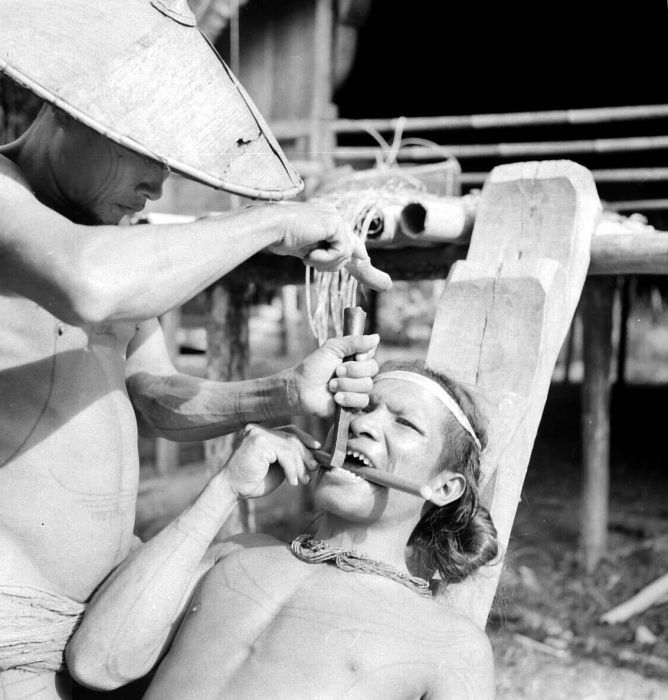
Teeth filing on a Mentawai man in the Mentawai Islands, Dutch East Indies, c. 1938

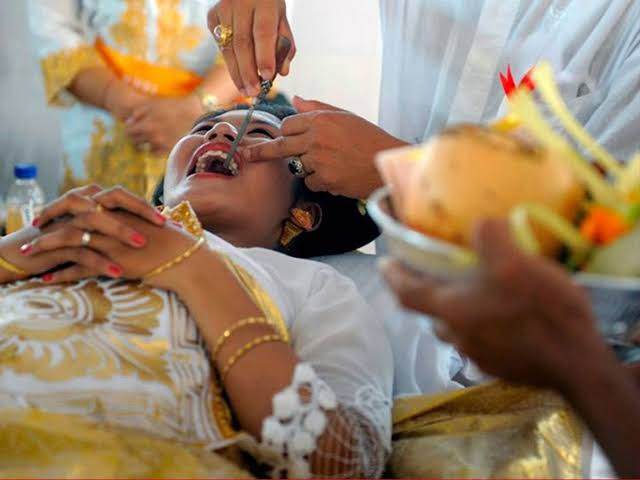
Indonesian traditional ritual Potong gigi (lit. 'Cutting teeth') in Bali

Teeth blackening was the custom of dyeing one's teeth black with various tannin-rich plant dyes. It was practiced throughout almost the entire range of Austronesia, including Island Southeast Asia, Madagascar, Micronesia, and Island Melanesia, reaching as far east as Malaita. However, it was absent in Polynesia. It also existed in non-Austronesian populations in Mainland Southeast Asia and Japan. The practice was primarily preventative, as it reduced the chances of developing tooth decay, similar to modern dental sealants. It also had cultural significance and was seen as beautiful. A common sentiment was that blackened teeth separated humans from animals.

For example in Bali, Indonesia, Potong gigi, also known as mesangih or mepandes, is a form of ritual body modification of adolescents, typically teenagers, in parts of Bali that involves the filing of the canine teeth. Traditional Balinese belief states that "protruding canines represent the animal-like nature of human beings";

=== Religion ===
The religious traditions of the Austronesian people focus mostly on ancestral spirits, nature spirits, and gods, making it a complex animistic religion. Mythologies vary by culture and geographical location but share common basic aspects, such as ancestor worship, animism, shamanism, and the belief in a spirit world and powerful deities. There is also a great amount of shared mythology and a common belief in Mana.

Many of these beliefs have gradually been replaced. Examples of native religions include: Indigenous Philippine folk religions (including beliefs in Anito), Indigenous Indonesian folk religion (Sunda Wiwitan, Kejawen, Kaharingan), and Māori religion. Many Austronesian religious beliefs have been incorporated into foreign religions, such as Hinduism, Buddhism, Christianity, and Islam, which Austronesian peoples were introduced to later.

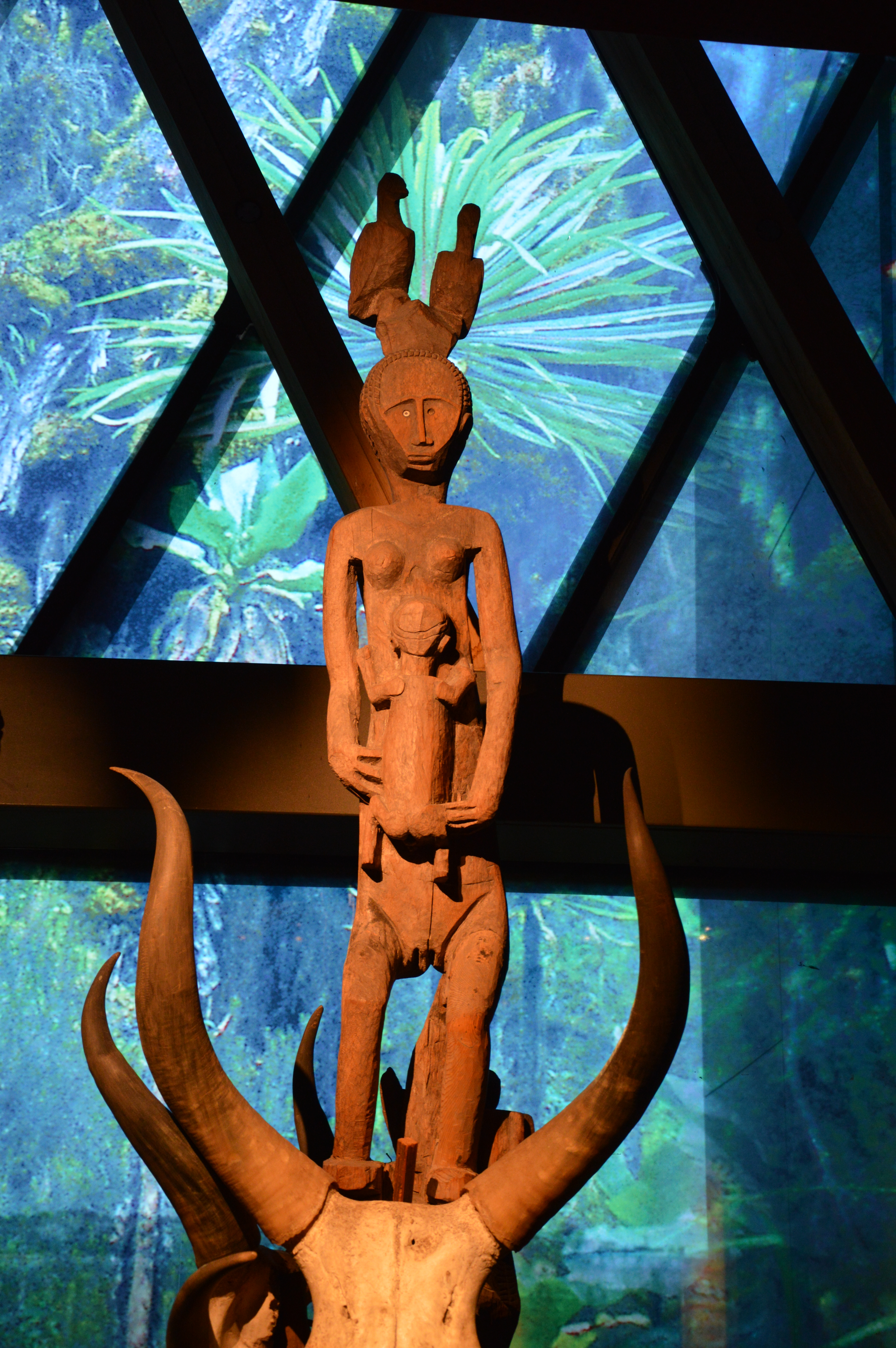
Aloalo funerary pole of the Sakalava people of Madagascar

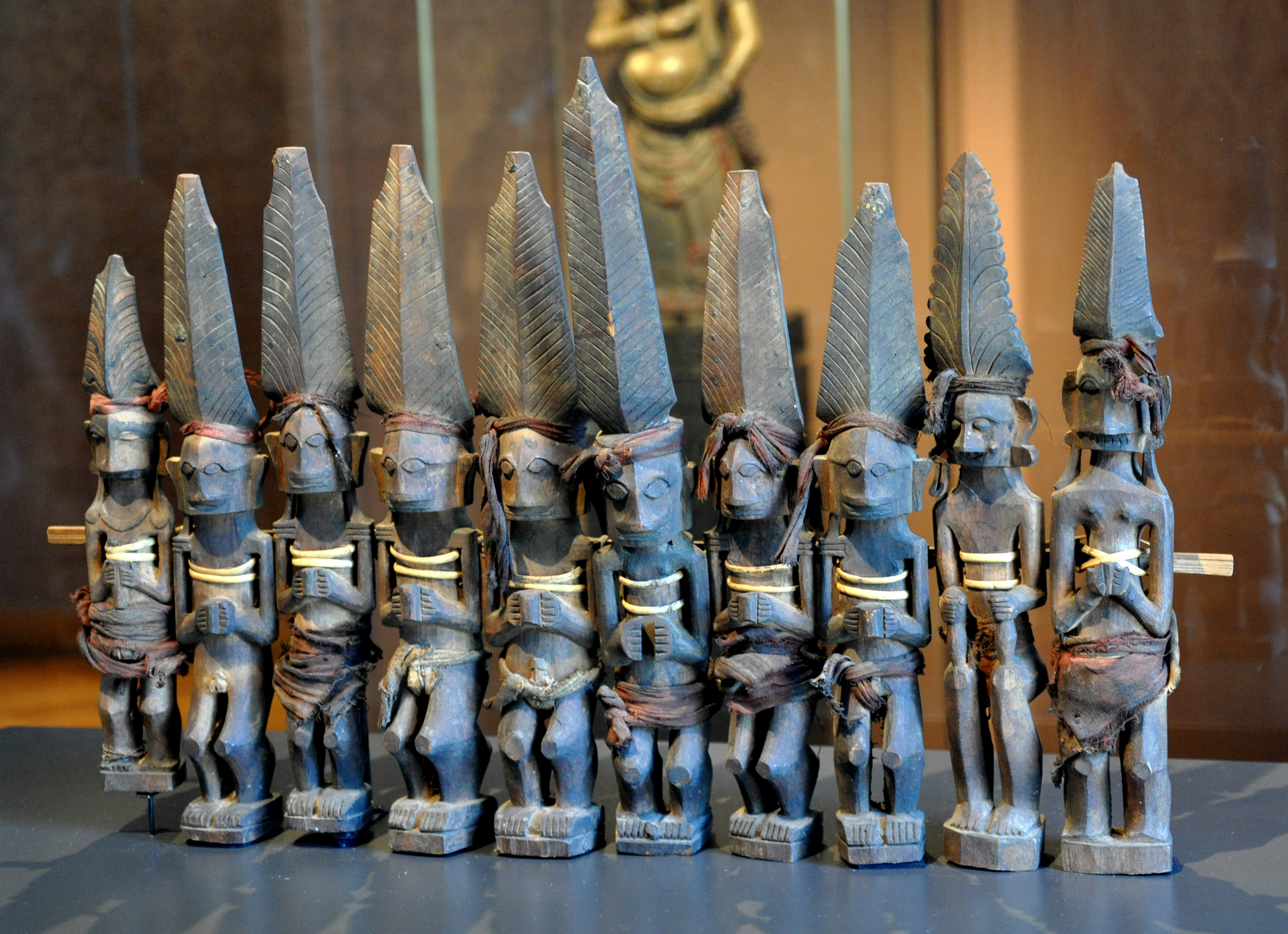
Adu zatua ancestor carvings of the Nias people of western Indonesia

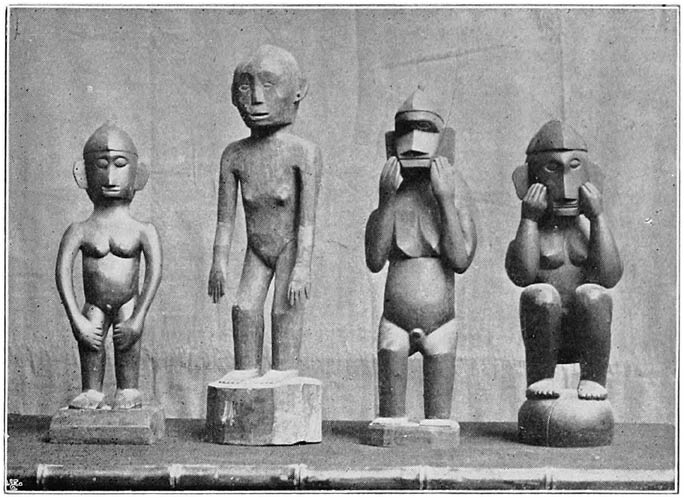
Taotao carvings of anito ancestor spirits from the Ifugao people, Philippines

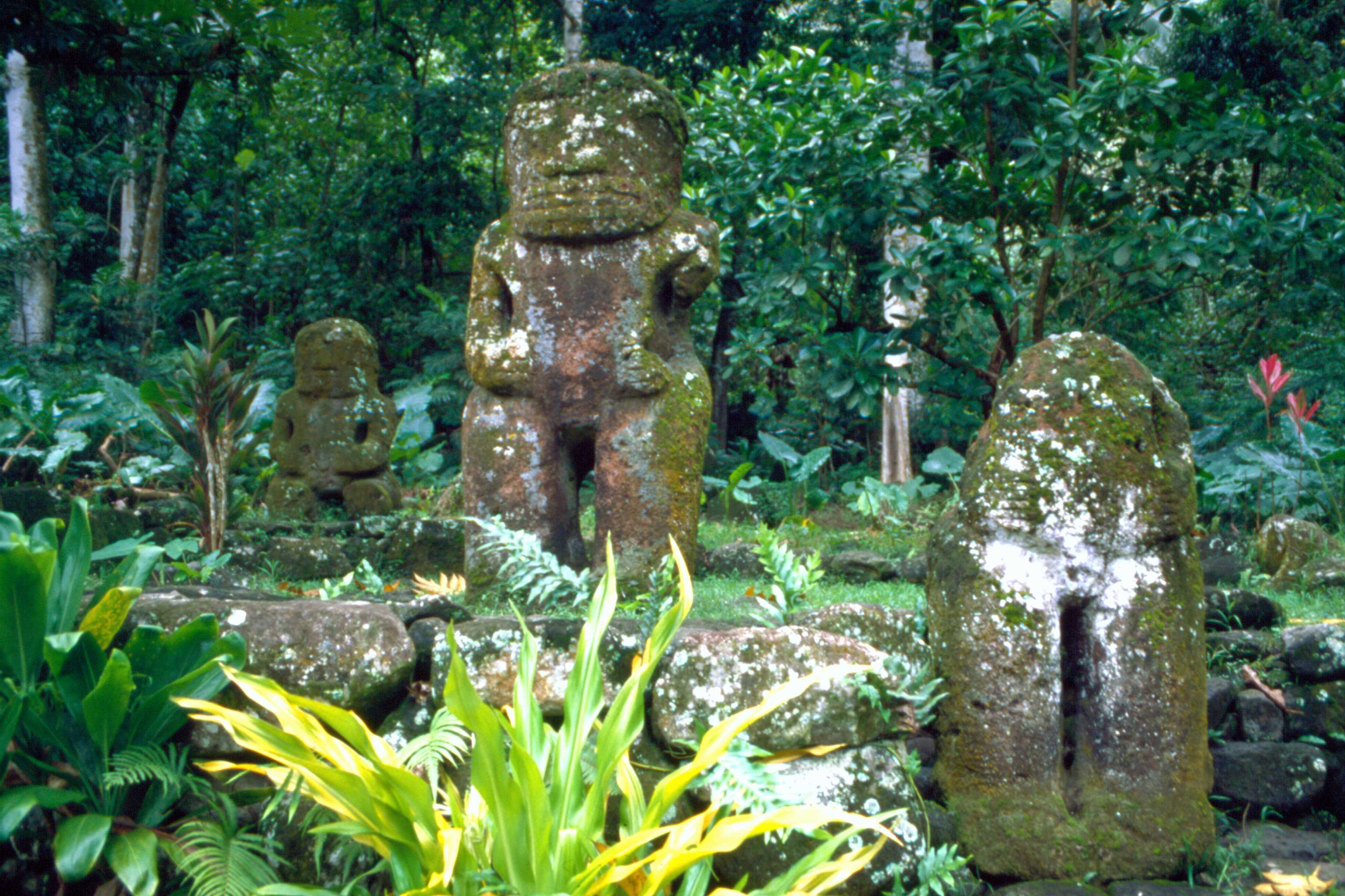
Stone tiki from Hiva Oa, Marquesas

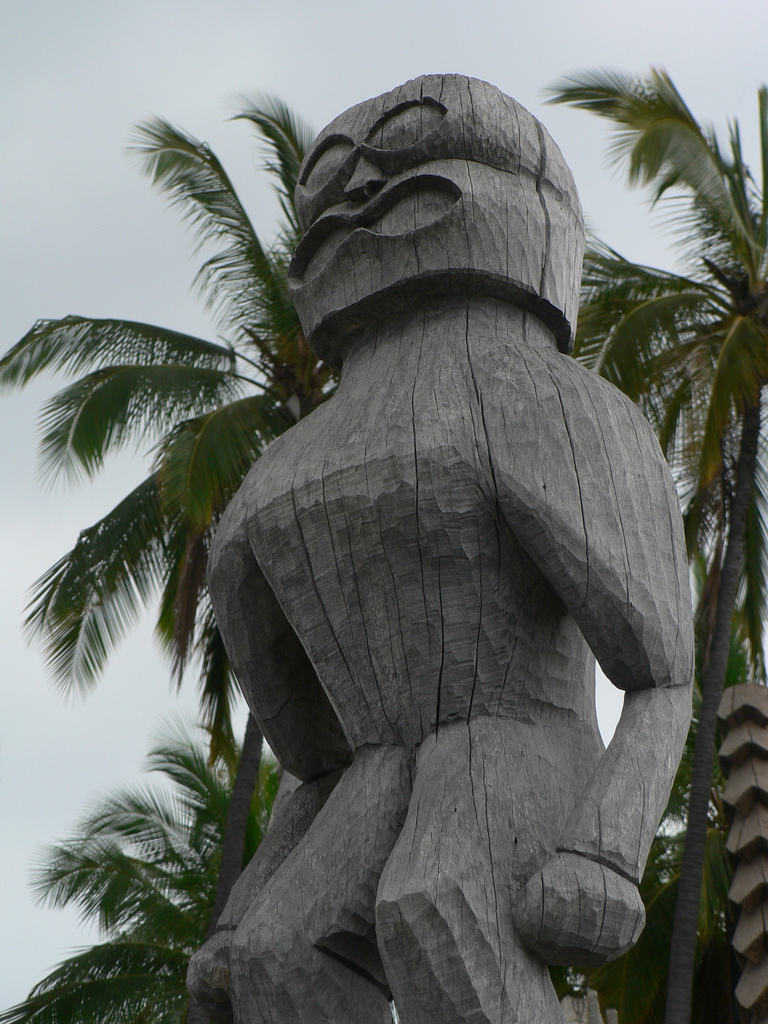
Kiʻi carving at Puʻuhonua o Hōnaunau, Hawaiʻi

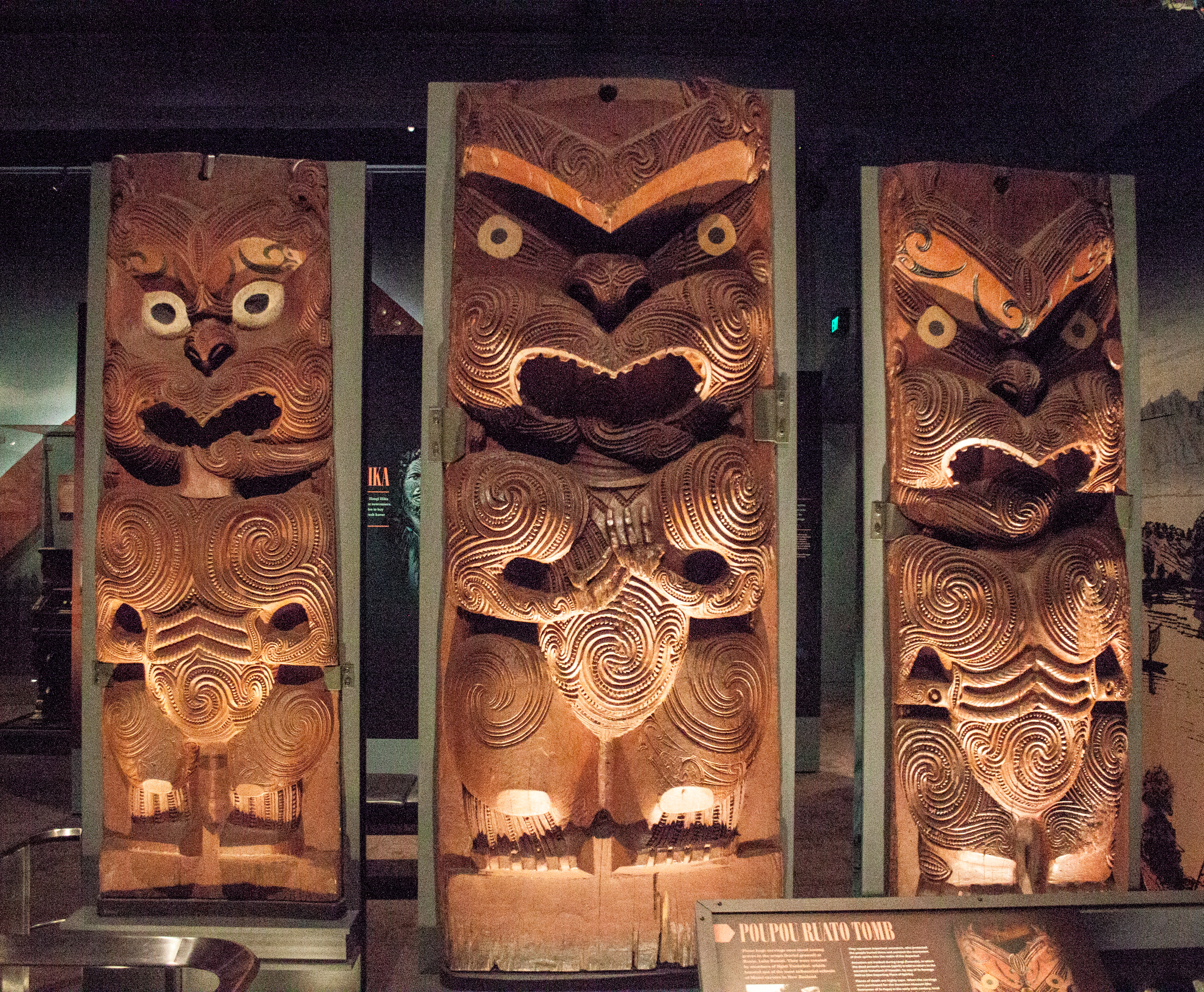
Māori poupou from the Ruato tomb of Rotorua

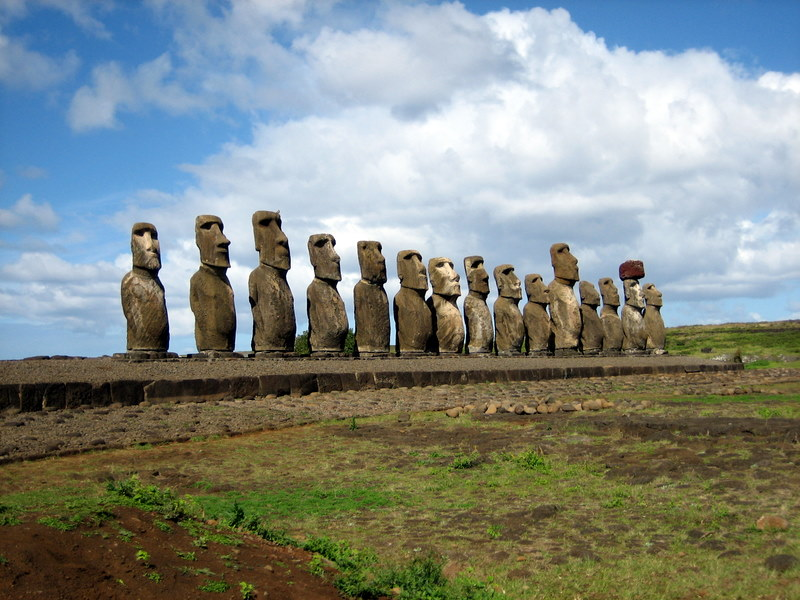
Moai in Ahu Tongariki, Rapa Nui

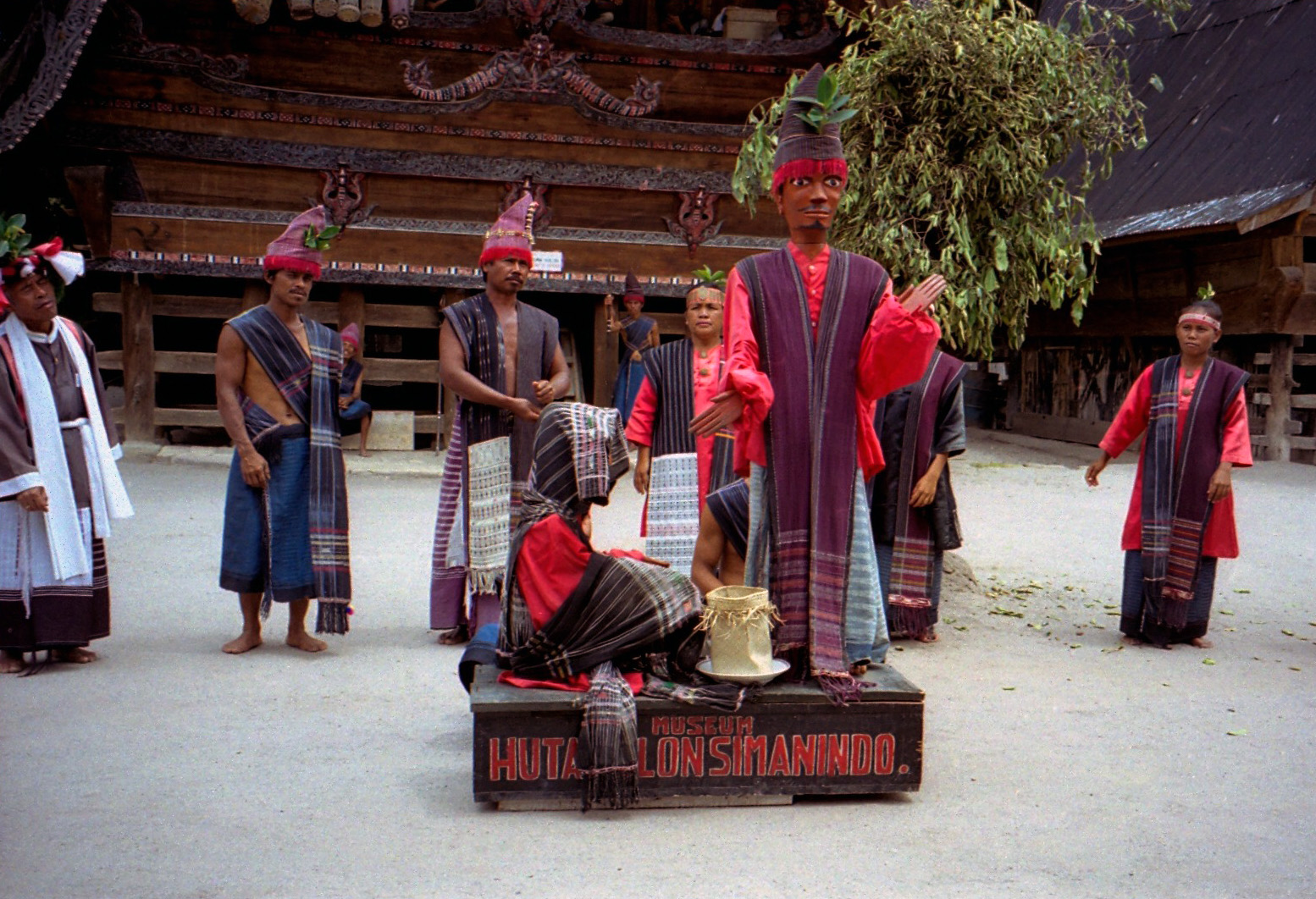
Bataks Sigalegale (wooden puppet funeral dance performance) near Samosir Island, Indonesia.

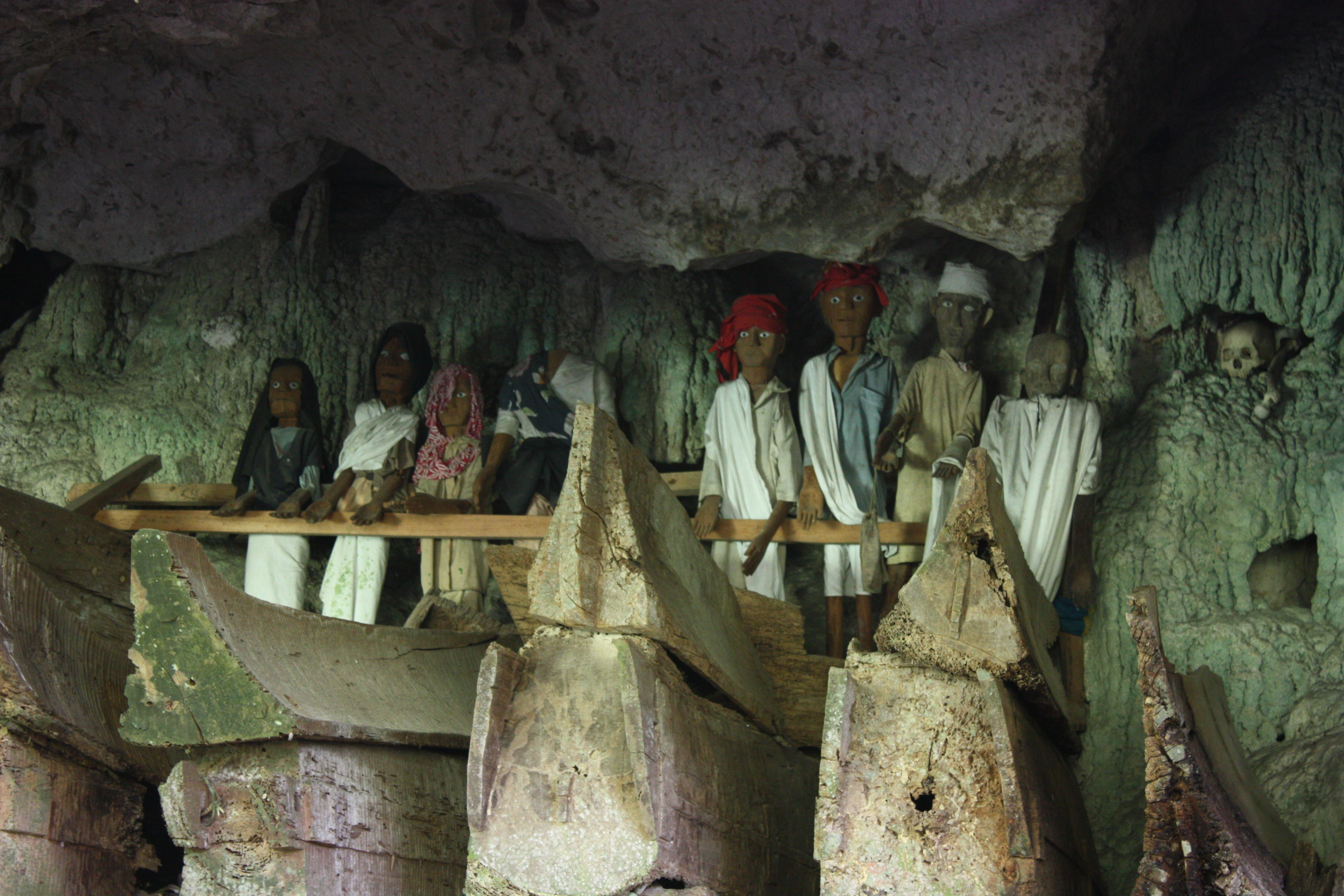
Toraja tau tau (wooden statue of the deceased) in South Sulawesi, Indonesia (also note the boat-shaped coffins)

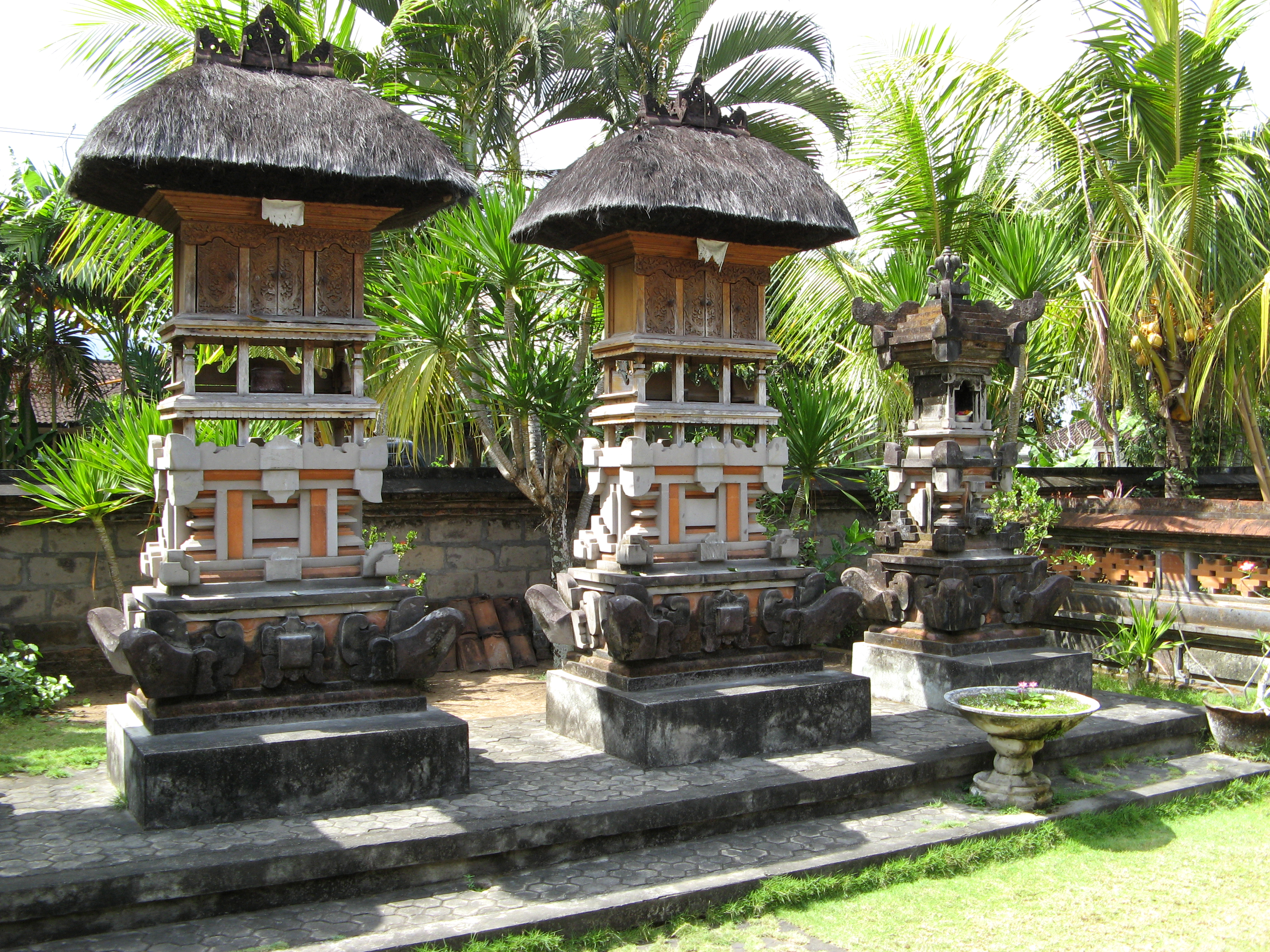
Balinese small familial house shrines to honor the households' ancestors in Indonesia

=== Writing ===
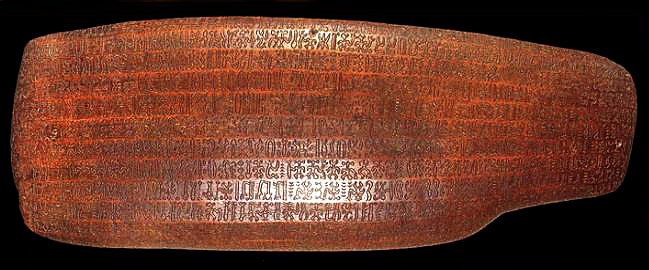
Tablet B of rongorongo, an undeciphered system of glyphs from Rapa Nui

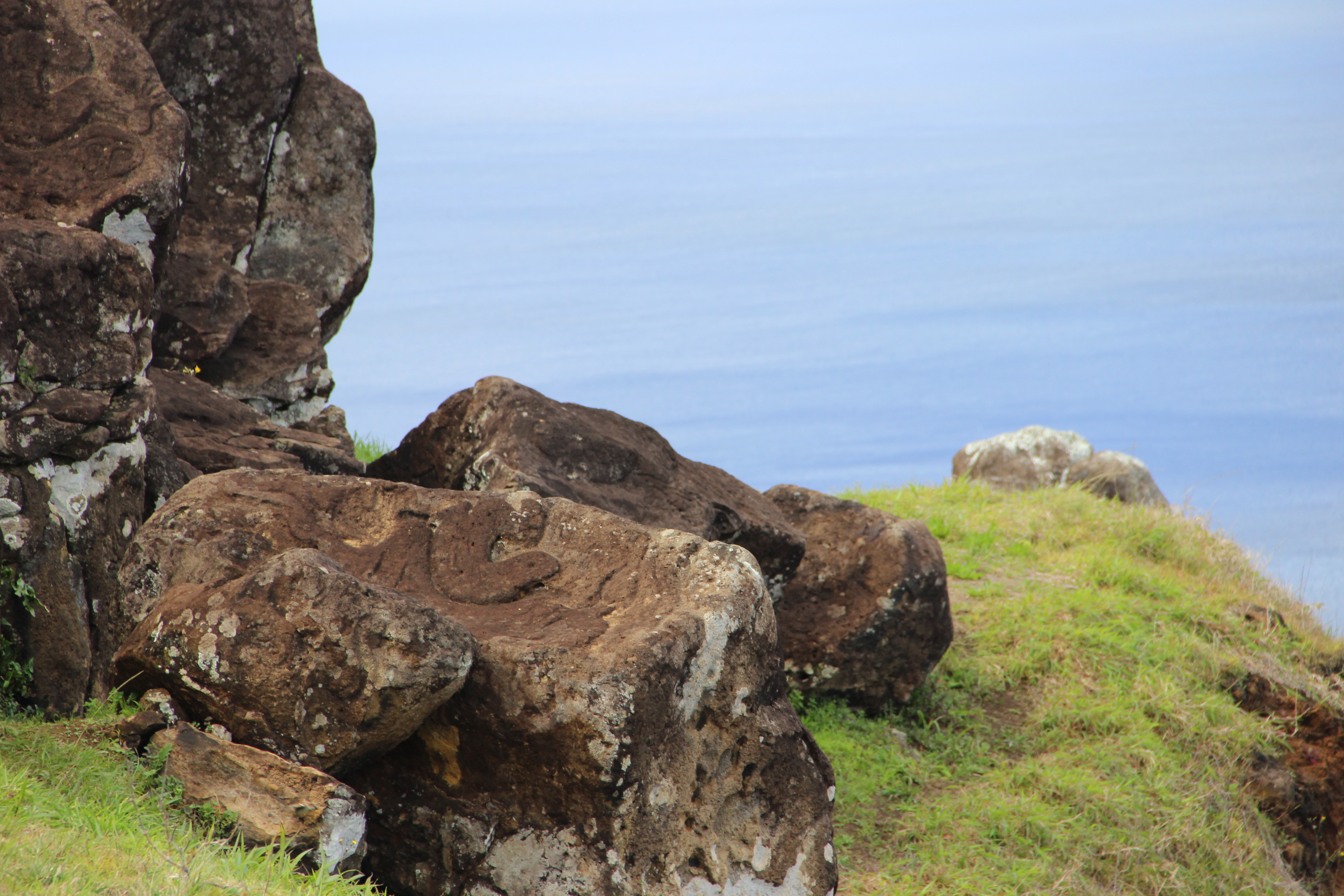
An example of the abundant petroglyphs in Orongo, Rapa Nui, associated with the tangata manu cult of Makemake. Rongorongo does not appear in any of these petroglyphs.

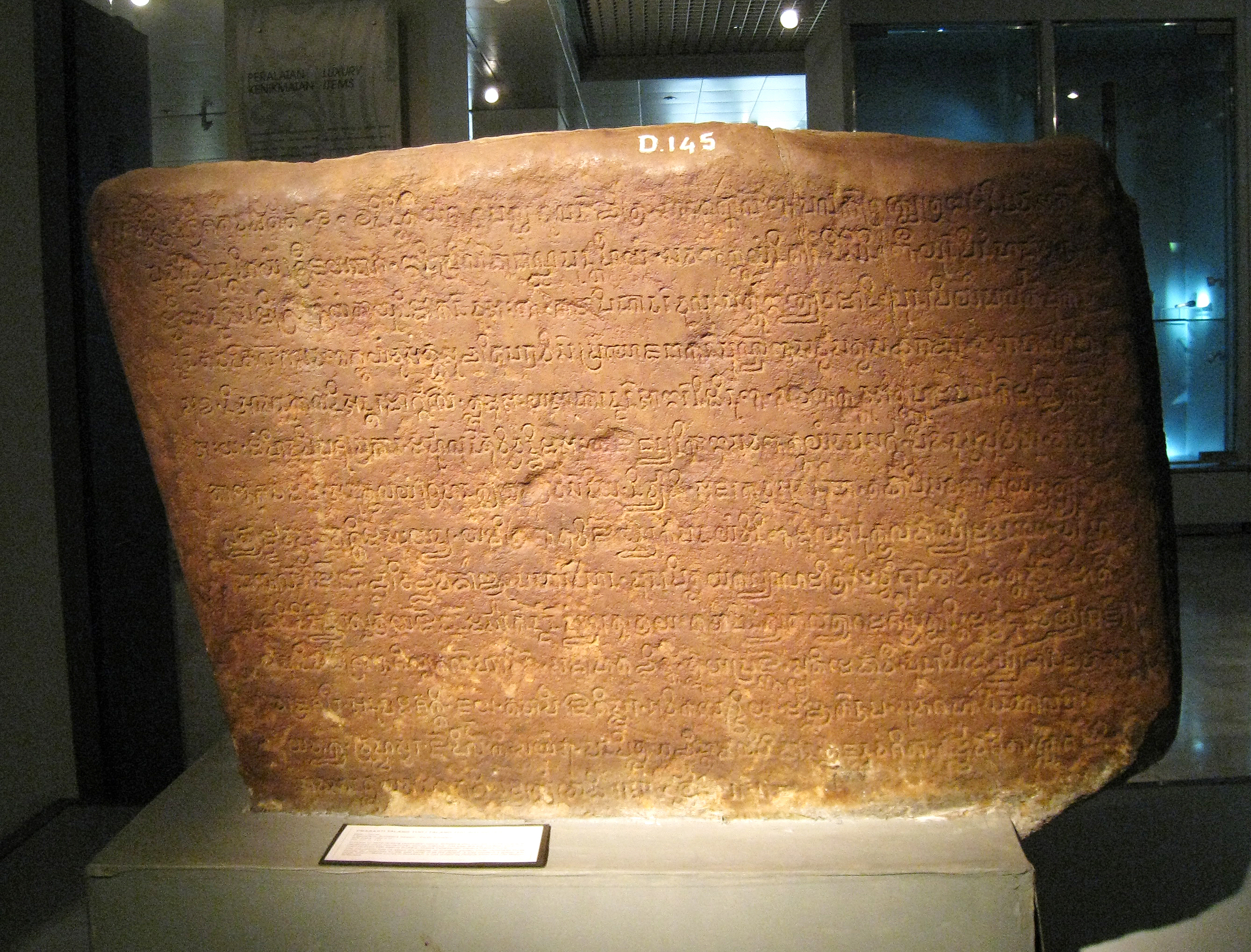
The Talang Tuo inscription, a 7th-century Srivijaya stele featuring Old Malay written in a derivative of the Pallava script

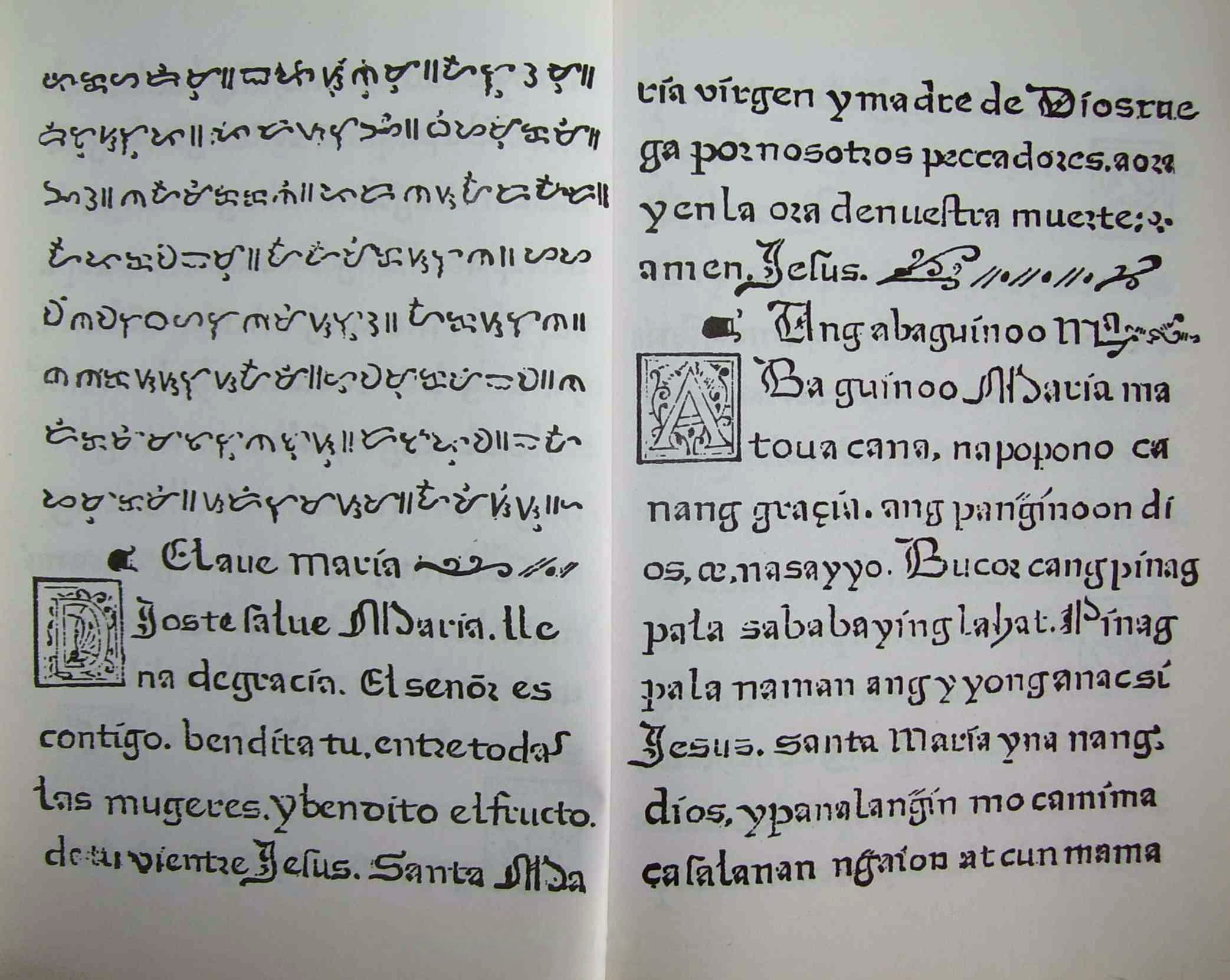
Page from Doctrina Cristiana Española Y Tagala (1593) featuring the Baybayin script alongside the Latin alphabet

With the possible exception of rongorongo on Rapa Nui, Austronesians did not have an indigenous writing system but rather adopted or developed writing systems after contact with various non-Austronesian cultures. There existed various forms of symbolic communication using pictograms and petroglyphs, but these did not encode language.

Rongorongo, said to have originally been called kohau motu mo rongorongo ("lines of inscriptions for chanting out"), is the only pre-contact indigenous Austronesian system of glyphs that appear to be true writing or at least proto-writing. They consist of around 120 glyphs, ranging from representations of plants to animals, celestial objects, and geometric shapes. They were inscribed into wooden tablets about 12 to 20 in (30 to 51 cm) long using shark teeth and obsidian flakes. The wood allegedly came from toromiro and makoʻi trees, which is notable given that Rapa Nui was completely deforested at the time of European contact. Of the surviving two dozen tablets, a few were made from trees introduced after European contact, as well as wood originating from European ships and driftwood. Rapa Nui also has a rich assemblage of petroglyphs largely associated with the tangata manu ("birdman") cult of Makemake. Although some rongorongo glyphs may have been derived from these petroglyphs, rongorongo does not appear in any of the abundant rock carvings in Rapa Nui and seems to be restricted to the wooden tablets.

The tablets were first described by an outsider in 1864 by the Catholic missionary Eugène Eyraud, who said they were found "in all the houses". However, he paid them little attention, and they remained unnoticed by the outside world. It was not until 1869 that one of the tablets came into the possession of Florentin-Étienne Jaussen, the Bishop of Tahiti. He brought the tablets to the world's attention and instructed the Rapa Nui mission to gather more information about them. But by then, most of the tablets were allegedly already destroyed, presumed to have been used as fuel by the natives on the deforested island.

At the time of discovery of the tablets, Rapa Nui had undergone severe depopulation. This was largely due to the loss of the island's last trees and the Peruvian and Chilean slave raids in the early 1860s. The literate ruling classes of the Rapa Nui people (including the royal family and the religious caste) and the majority of the island's population were kidnapped or killed in the slave raids. Most of those taken died after only one or two years in captivity from harsh working conditions and European diseases. Succeeding epidemics of smallpox and tuberculosis further decimated the island's population to the point that there were not enough people to bury the dead. The last remnants of the Rapa Nui people were assimilated by the Tahitians who were later brought to the island in an effort to repopulate it, further resulting in the loss of most of the Old Rapa Nui language.

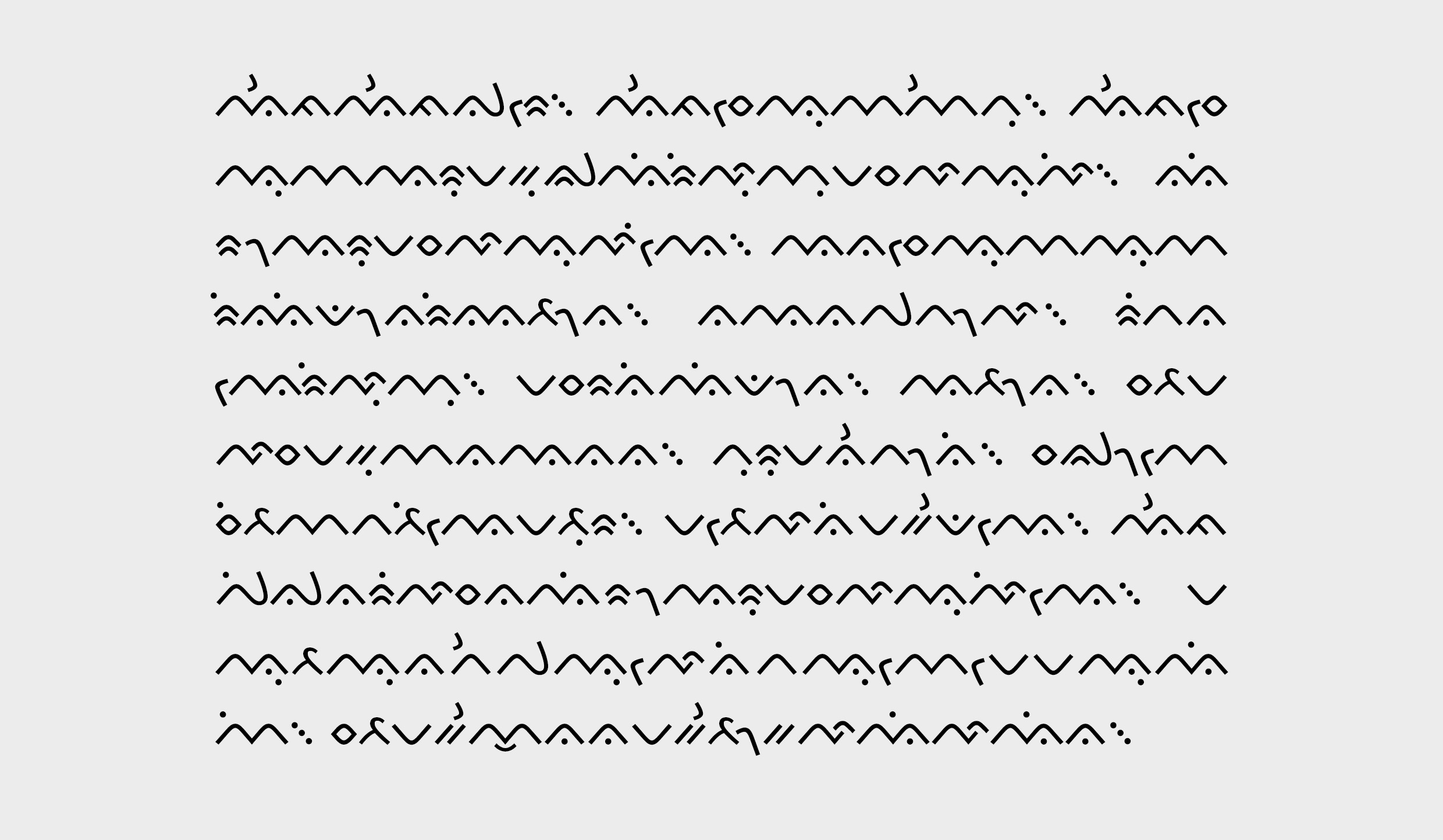
Lontara script used by Buginesse on the island of Sulawesi, Indonesia

Oral tradition holds that the ruling classes were the only ones who could read the tablets, and the ability to decipher the tablets was lost along with them. Numerous attempts have been made to read the tablets, starting from a few years after their discovery. But to this day, none have proven successful. Some authors have proposed that rongorongo may have been an attempt to imitate European script after the idea of writing was introduced during the "signing" of the 1770 Spanish Treaty of Annexation or through knowledge of European writing acquired elsewhere. They cite various reasons, including the lack of attestation of rongorongo prior to the 1860s, the clearly more recent provenance of some of the tablets, the lack of antecedents, and the lack of additional archaeological evidence since its discovery. Others argue that it was merely a mnemonic list of symbols meant to guide incantations. Whether rongorongo is merely an example of trans-cultural diffusion or a true indigenous Austronesian writing system (and one of the few independent inventions of writing in human history) remains unknown.

In Southeast Asia, the first true writing systems of pre-modern Austronesian cultures were all derived from the Grantha and Pallava Brahmic scripts, all of which are abugidas from South India. Various forms of abugidas spread throughout Austronesian cultures in Southeast Asia as kingdoms became Indianized through early maritime trading. The oldest use of abugida scripts in Austronesian cultures are 4th-century stone inscriptions written in Cham, from Vietnam. There are numerous other Brahmic-derived writing systems among Southeast Asian Austronesians, usually specific to a certain ethnic group. Notable examples include Balinese, Batak, Baybayin, Buhid, Hanunó'o, Javanese, Kulitan, Lontara, Old Kawi, Rejang, Rencong, Sundanese, and Tagbanwa. They vary from having letters with rounded shapes to characters with sharp cuneiform-like angles, as a result of the difference in writing mediums, with the former being ideal for writing on soft leaves and the latter on bamboo panels. The use of the scripts ranged from mundane records to encoding esoteric knowledge on magico-religious rituals and folk medicine.

In regions that converted to Islam, abjads derived from the Arabic script started replacing the earlier abugidas at around the 13th century in Southeast Asia. Madagascar adopted the Arabic script in the 14th century. Abjads, however, have an even greater inherent problem with encoding Austronesian languages than abugidas, because Austronesian languages have more varied and salient vowels that the Arabic script usually cannot encode. As a result, the Austronesian adaptations such as the Jawi and the Pegon scripts have been modified with a system of diacritics that encode sounds, both vowels and consonants, native to Austronesian languages but absent in Semitic ones. With the advent of the Colonial Era, almost all of these writing systems have been replaced with alphabets adapted from the Latin, as in the Hawaiian, Filipino, and Malay alphabet. However, several Formosan languages had been written in zhuyin, and Cia-Cia off Sulawesi has experimented with hangul.

On Woleai and surrounding islands, a script was developed for the Woleaian language in the early 20th century. Approximately 20% of the script's letterforms were borrowed from Latin letters; the remaining characters seem to have been derived from indigenous iconography. Despite this heavy Latin influence, the script was a syllabary.

Vanuatu has a unique tradition of sand drawing, in which images are created by a single continuous line drawn in the sand. It is believed to have functioned as a means of symbolic communication in pre-contact Island Melanesia, especially between travelers and ethnic groups that do not speak the same language. The sand drawings consist of around 300 different designs and seem to be shared across language groups. In the 1990s, elements of the drawings were adapted into a modern constructed script called Avoiuli by the Turaga indigenous movement on Pentecost Island.

== Genetic studies ==
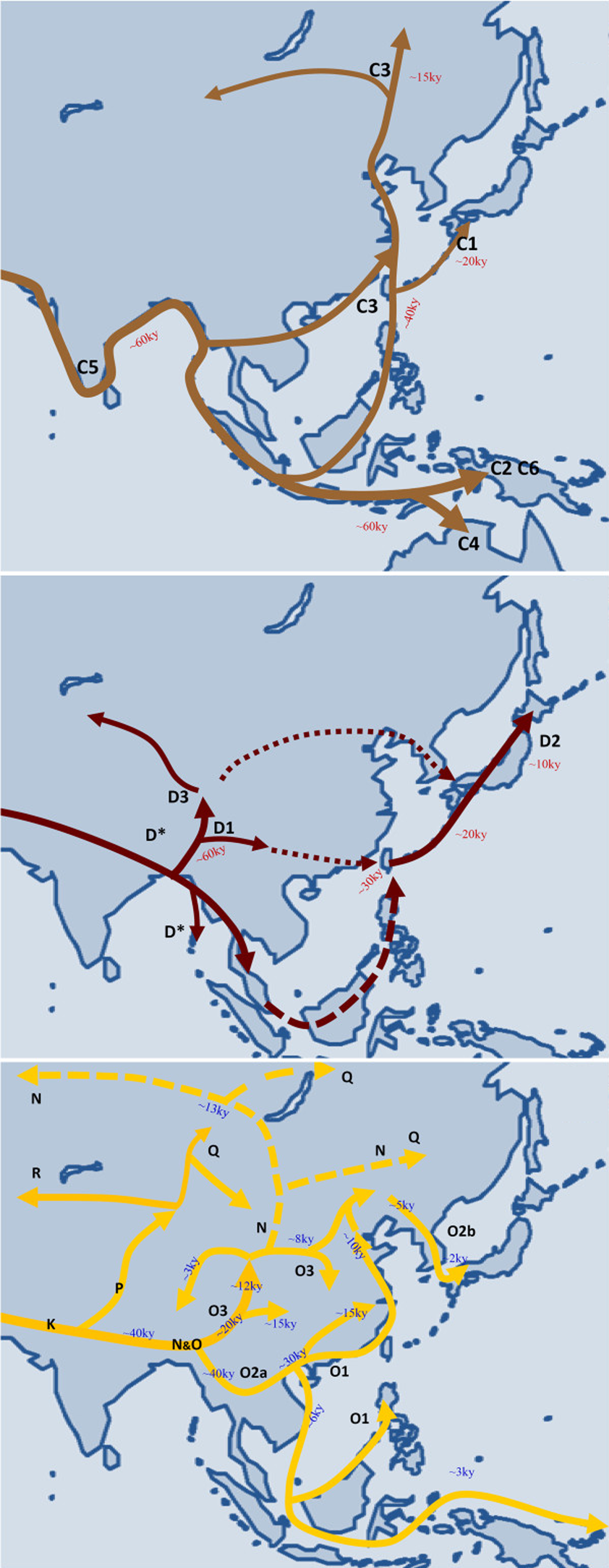
Migration routes of major Y-chromosome DNA haplogroups in East and Southeast Asia.

Genetic studies have been conducted on Austronesian peoples. Haplogroup O1a, marked by the M119 SNP, is frequently detected in native Taiwanese and northern Filipinos, as well as some people in Indonesia, Malaysia, and non-Austronesian populations in southern China. A 2007 analysis of the DNA recovered from human remains in archaeological sites of prehistoric peoples along the Yangtze River in China also shows high frequencies of Haplogroup O1 in the Neolithic Liangzhu culture, linking them to Austronesian and Tai-Kadai peoples. The Liangzhu culture existed in coastal areas around the mouth of the Yangtze. Haplogroup O1 was absent in other archaeological sites inland. The authors of the study suggest that this may be evidence of two different human migration routes during the peopling of Eastern Asia; one coastal and the other inland, with little gene flow between them.

The 'core Austronesian' population derives more ancestry from Late Neolithic Fujian-related sources (66.9%–74.3%), similar to present Kra-Dai groups and southeastern Han Chinese. There's also strong affinities to Qihe3 from Early Neolithic Fujian, who clusters with the Boshan individual from Early Neolithic Shandong and is genetically indistingusihable from Liangdao-2. In contrast, Late Neolithic Fujianese populations, like Xitoucun and Tanshishan, have higher affinities with Dushan-related populations, who have slightly more affinities for present Austroasiatic-speaking groups. Likewise, the Taiwan Hanben population is closely related to Dushan-related populations and are related to the Taiwan Gongguan population, Longli Bouyei and Qiandongnan Dong, who are representatives of the ancestral Kra-Dai population, Kinh Vietnamese etc. Another study states affirms the southeastern Chinese origins of the 'proto-Austronesian' population although there is evidence that they mixed with contemporary populations from Shandong. Using the Atayal as proxies for the ancestral Austronesian population, they can also be modeled as a mixture of North Indian-related (6%) and Naxi/Miao-related groups (94%). A 2025 study, however, suggests that proto-Austronesians might've had Yangtzean-related origins. Yangtzean ancestry, which is characterized by the mixture of ancient southeastern Chinese-related (~60%) and Yellow River-related (~40%) ancestries, significantly contributed to groups like Ami, Atayal, Iron Age Taiwanese populations etc. These groups derive the rest of their ancestries from indigenous southeastern Chinese/Taiwanese sources. Yangtzean ancestry also constitutes the southern East Asian ancestry found within ancient Yellow River and Shandong populations.

An important breakthrough in studies in Austronesian genetics was the identification of the "Polynesian motif" (haplogroup B4a1a1) in 1989, a specific nine-base-pair deletion mutation in mitochondrial DNA. Several studies have shown that it is shared by Polynesians and Island Southeast Asians, with a sub-branch also identified in Madagascar, indicating shared maternal ancestry among Austronesians. Austronesian-speaking regions also have high-to-moderate frequencies of haplogroup O1 of the Y-DNA (including Madagascar), indicating shared paternal ancestry, with the exception of Polynesia where the Papuan-derived haplogroup C2a1 predominates (although lower frequencies of Austronesian haplogroup O-M122 also exist). This indicates that the Lapita people, the direct ancestors of Polynesians, were likely matrilocal, assimilating Papuan men from outside the community by marriage in Near Oceania, prior to the Polynesian expansion into Remote Oceania.

Moodley et al. (2009) identified two distinct populations of the gut bacteria Helicobacter pylori that accompanied human migrations into Island Southeast Asia and Oceania, called hpSahul and hspMāori. The study sampled Native Australians, Native Taiwanese, highlanders in New Guinea, and Melanesians and Polynesians in New Caledonia, which were then compared with other H. pylori haplotypes from Europeans, Asians, Pacific Islanders, and others. They found that hpSahul diverged from mainland Asian H. pylori populations approximately 31,000 to 37,000 years ago and have remained isolated for 23,000 to 32,000 years, confirming the Australo-Melanesian substratum in Island Southeast Asia and New Guinea. hspMāori, on the other hand, is a subpopulation of hpEastAsia, previously isolated from Polynesians (Māori, Tongans, Samoans) in New Zealand, and three individuals from the Philippines and Japan. The study found hspMāori from Native Taiwanese, Melanesians, Polynesians, and two inhabitants from the Torres Strait Islands, all of which are Austronesian sources. As expected, hspMāori showed greatest genetic diversity in Taiwan, while all non-Taiwanese hspMāori populations belonged to a single lineage they called the "Pacific clade". They also calculated the isolation-with-migration model (IMa), which showed that the divergence of the Pacific clade of hspMāori was unidirectional from Taiwan to the Pacific. This is consistent with the Out-of-Taiwan model of Austronesian expansion.

A 2014 study states that Austronesian populations from Island Southeast Asia and Oceania, such as Fiji and Polynesia, have 30–90% Taiwan-related ancestry. Populations from western Island Southeast Asia have ~10–60% H'tin-related ancestry, with the rest being Taiwan-related and Negrito-related. In contrast, there is no Taiwan-related ancestry in admixed Mainland Southeast Asian populations that do not traditionally speak Austronesian languages.

On 16 January 2020, the personal genomics company 23andMe added the category "Filipino & Austronesian" after customers with no known Filipino ancestors were getting false positives for 5% or more "Filipino" ancestry in their ancestry composition report (the proportion was as high as 75% in Samoa, 71% in Tonga, 68% in Guam, 18% in Hawaii, and 34% in Madagascar). The company's scientists surmised that this was due to the shared Austronesian genetic heritage being incorrectly identified as Filipino ancestry.

According to a 2021 study, Cordillerans are the least admixed Austronesian group among the Austronesians of East Asia, especially Kankanaey, Bontoc, Balangao, Tuwali, Ayangan, Kalanguya, and Ibaloi groups. Compared to Austronesians like Ami and Atayal, they do not exhibit admixture with Austroasiatic-related and Northeast Asian-related groups. All Filipino subgroups likewise show closer affinities to Cordillerans than Ami and Atayal. Nonetheless, Ami, Atayal and Cordillerans all share strong affinities with Malaysians, Indonesians, Oceanians and even ancient individuals from peninsular Malaysia and Oceanian Lapita. Cordillerans are also closely related to the ~7,000 to 8,000-y-old Liangdao-2 individual and did not receive the northern East Asian ancestry that was introduced in this individual. Compared to other Filipino subgroups, Central Cordillerans show no admixture with indigenous Negritos despite extensive interaction with their neighbors. However, there is evidence of northern East Asian ancestry being introduced to the Batanes Islands and coastal regions of Luzon after the initial Cordilleran settlement of the Philippines from Taiwan. Likewise, there is evidence of low-lying European ancestry in individuals from Bolinao, Cebuano, Ibaloi, Itabayaten, Ilocano, Ivatan, Kapampangan, Pangasinan, and Yogad groups, along with some urbanized lowlanders, Bicolanos and Spanish Creole-speaking Chavacanos, dating back to the Spanish colonial period.

A 2023 study, however, states that present Kankanaey groups have about ~33% northern East Asian ancestry, similar to what is found in Taiwan Highland/Taiwan Orchid Island groups, who have ~28–37% northern East Asian ancestry. These findings suggest considerable northern East Asian influence in Taiwan prior to the Out-of-Taiwan expansions. For example, other early Out-of-Taiwan (i.e. Lapita) groups have more northern East Asian ancestry than Into-Taiwan groups (~21–29% vs. ~0–8%).

Austronesian-related populations also partially contributed to the genomes of Jōmon peoples and Koreans. However, the affinities between Austronesians and Jōmon more likely reflect shared descent or genetic input from the Jōmon into Austronesians themselves. Other studies show no significant gene flow from Austronesians to the Jōmon, including Ryukyuan Jōmon.

=== Evidence from agriculture ===
The Austronesian migrations were accompanied by a set of domesticated, semi-domesticated, and commensal plants and animals transported via outrigger ships and catamarans that enabled early Austronesians to thrive in their mostly island environments. These include crops and animals believed to have originated from the Hemudu and Majiabang cultures in the hypothetical pre-Austronesian homelands in mainland China, as well as other plants and animals believed to have been first domesticated from within Taiwan, Maritime Southeast Asia, and New Guinea. Some of these plants are sometimes also known as "canoe plants", especially in the context of Polynesian migrations. They provide another source of evidence for Austronesian population movements.

Notable examples of these crops include coconuts, bananas, rice, sugarcane, paper mulberry (tapa tree), breadfruit, taro, ube, areca nut (including the practice of betel chewing), ginger, turmeric, candlenut, pandan, and citruses. The cultivation of sweet potatoes in Polynesia may also be evidence of prehistoric Austronesian contact with the Americas, though this remains disputed. The domesticated animals carried in Austronesian voyages include dogs, pigs, and chickens.

Austronesians also introduced these crops and domesticated animals westward via trade links. Island Southeast Asians established spice trade links with the Dravidian-speaking regions in Sri Lanka and Southern India by around 1500 to 600 BCE. These early contacts resulted in the introduction of Austronesian crops and material culture to South Asia, including betel nut chewing, coconuts, sandalwood, domesticated bananas, sugarcane, cloves, and nutmeg. South Asian crops like the mung bean and horsegram were also present in Southeast Asia by 400–100 BCE, indicating the exchange was reciprocal.

There is also indirect evidence of very early Austronesian contacts with Africa, based on the presence and spread of Austronesian domesticates like bananas, taro, chickens, and purple yam in Africa in the first millennium BCE.

=== Pre-Columbian contact with the Americas ===
A genomic analysis in 2020 showed Austronesian contact with South America around 1150–1200 CE, the earliest one being between Fatu Hiva and Colombia.

== See also ==
- Ancient maritime history
- Domesticated plants and animals of Austronesia
- Ethnic groups in Southeast Asia
- Malayo-Polynesian languages
- Maritime Silk Road

== Books ==
- Bellwood, Peter S. (1979). Man's conquest of the Pacific: The prehistory of Southeast Asia and Oceania. Oxford University Press. ISBN 978-0-19-520103-1.
- Bellwood, Peter (2007). Prehistory of the Indo-Malaysian Archipelago (3rd, revised ed.). ANU E Press. ISBN 978-1-921313-12-7.
- Bellwood, Peter; Fox, James J.; Tryon, Darrell, eds. (2006). The Austronesians: historical and comparative perspectives. Australian National University. ISBN 978-1-920942-85-4.
- Diamond, Jared M. (1998). Guns, Germs, and Steel. Vintage. ISBN 978-84-8306-667-6.
- Benitez-Johannot, Purissima, ed. (2009). Paths of Origins. ArtPostAsia Books. ISBN 978-971-94292-0-3. Archived from the original on 16 October 2011.
- Fox, James J. (2006). Origins, Ancestry and Alliance: Explorations in Austronesian Ethnography. ANU E Press. ISBN 978-1-920942-87-8.
