= Hotu-iti =

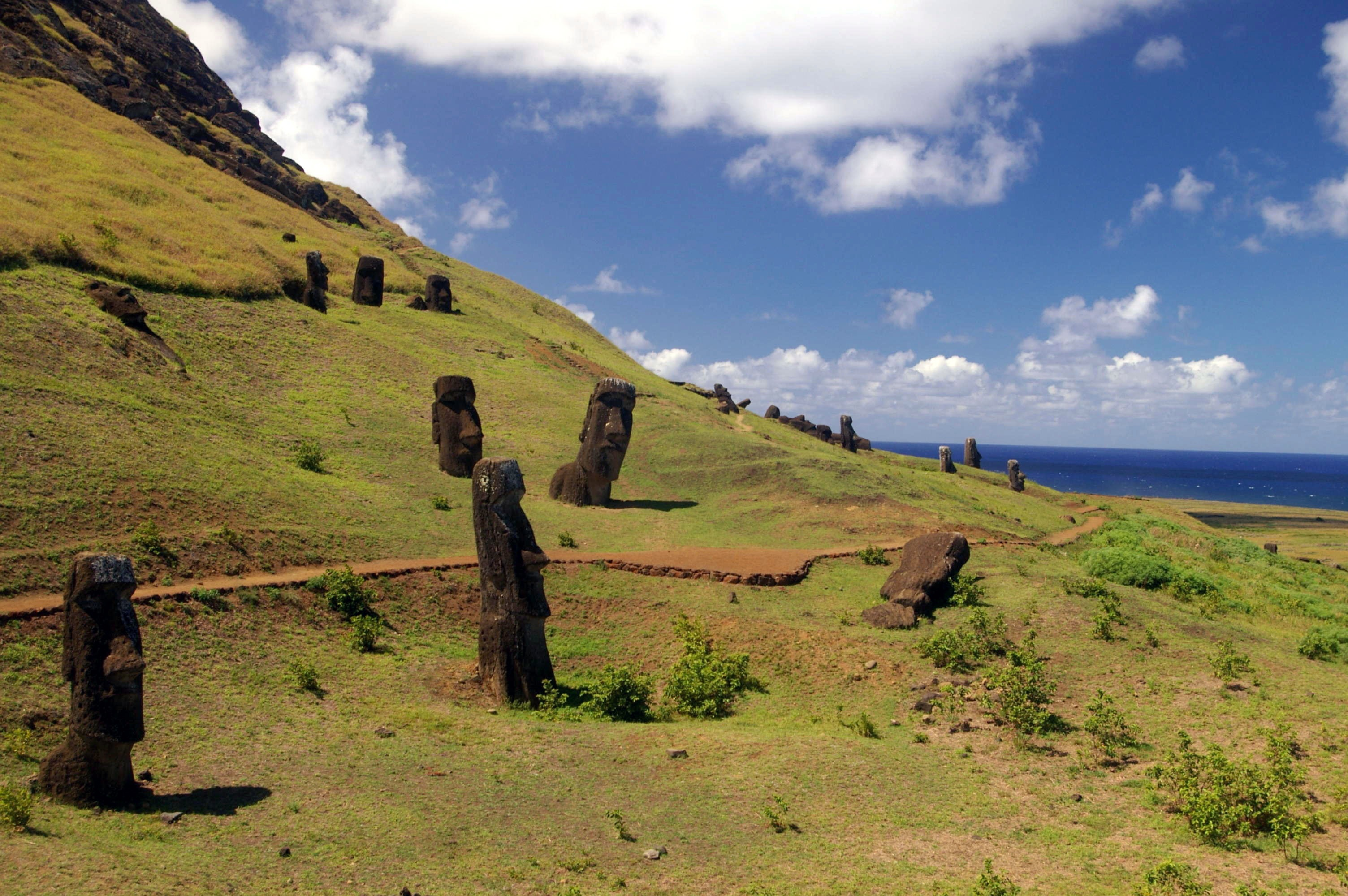
Outer slopes of Rano Raraku with twenty moai, some buried to the neck

Hotu-iti (also, "Tongariki territory") is an area of southeastern Easter Island that takes its name from a local clan. Located in Rapa Nui National Park, the area includes Rano Raraku crater, the Ahu Tongariki site, and a small bay. In the 15th and 16th centuries, the Hotu-iti clan was one of two polities on Easter Island.

== Geography ==
Hotu-iti contains Rano Raraku crater, which is the island's only source of a type of stone that was considered to be the best for carving statues; it was also a source of moss which was used for canoe caulking. Hotuiti Bay, a small cove, is protected by the cliffs of the Poike Peninsula. According to local legend, the god Tangaroa was killed in the bay and was buried in the vicinity. The Rano Raraku cliffs and quarry stand above Hotu-iti. The landscape has been described as a "wondrous spiritual landscape of striking beauty".

== History ==
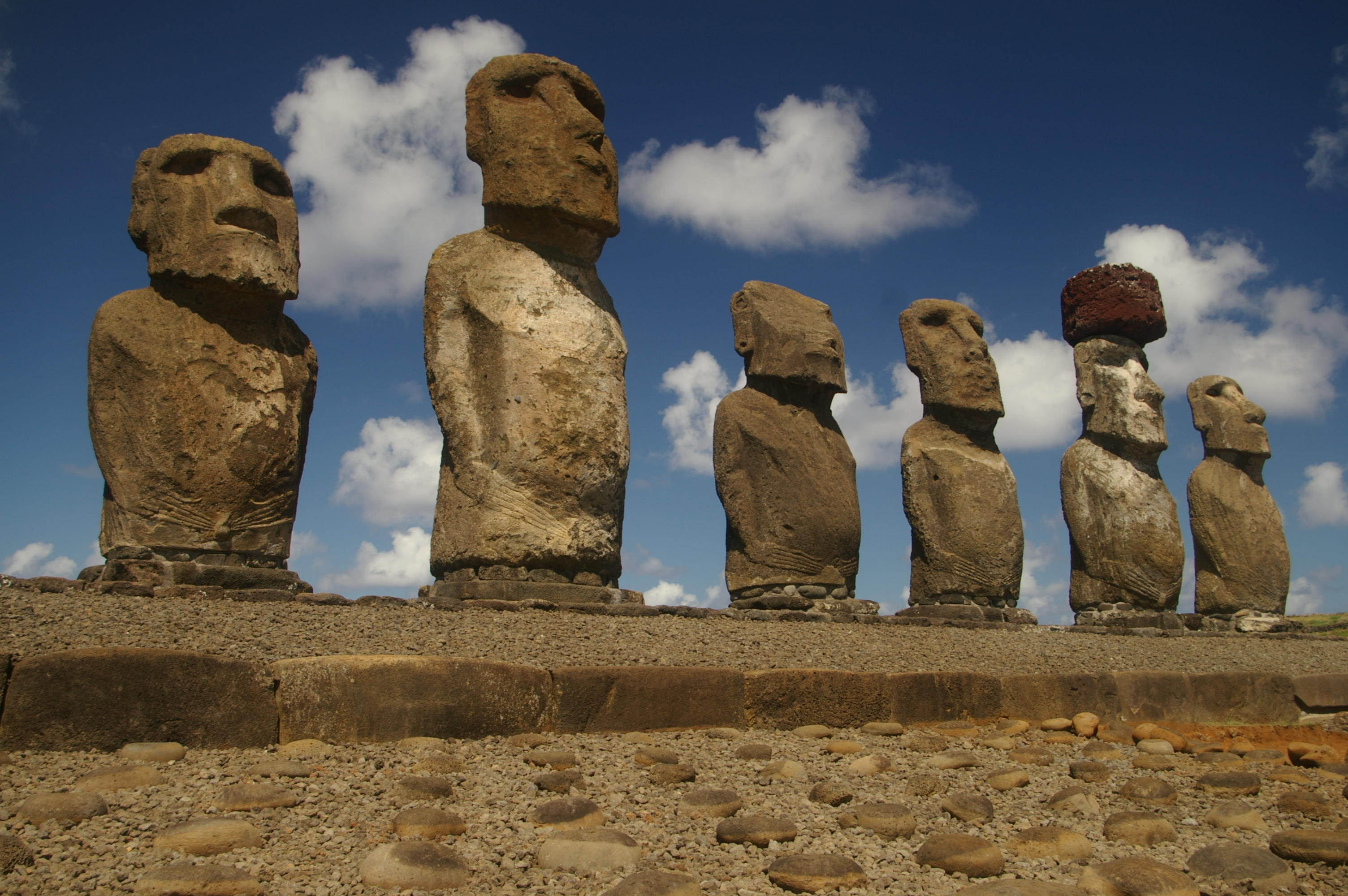
Six of the fifteen Ahu Tongariki moai

In the 15th and 16th centuries, the island was divided into two polities, described as either west (Tu'u) and east (Hotu-iti) confederacies, with Hotu-iti being the lower ranked; or northern (Tu'u Aro) and southern (Hotu-iti). In 1960, a tsunami, approximately 6 metres (20 ft) above sea level, crossed 500 metres (1,600 ft) of Hotu-iti, sweeping away ahu and moai (statues), and scattering them by 50–150 metres (160–490 ft). Fifteen statues of Hotu-iti's Ahu Tongariki site were damaged; a team of Japanese archaeologists restored the site between 1992 and 1994.

== Leadership ==
In Polynesian mythology, Hotu-iti was the youngest and favourite son of Hotu Matu'a, the legendary first settler of Easter Island. One of the known chiefs of the Hotu-iti clan was Kainga, said to be a descendant of the sixth son of the first king who "proved himself a valiant warrior." He had a son who succeeded him named Huriavai. The Tupahotu, Koro-Orongo and Ure-o-Hei clans were considered part of the Hotu-iti clan.
