= Puna Pau =

Prehistoric quarry in Easter Island

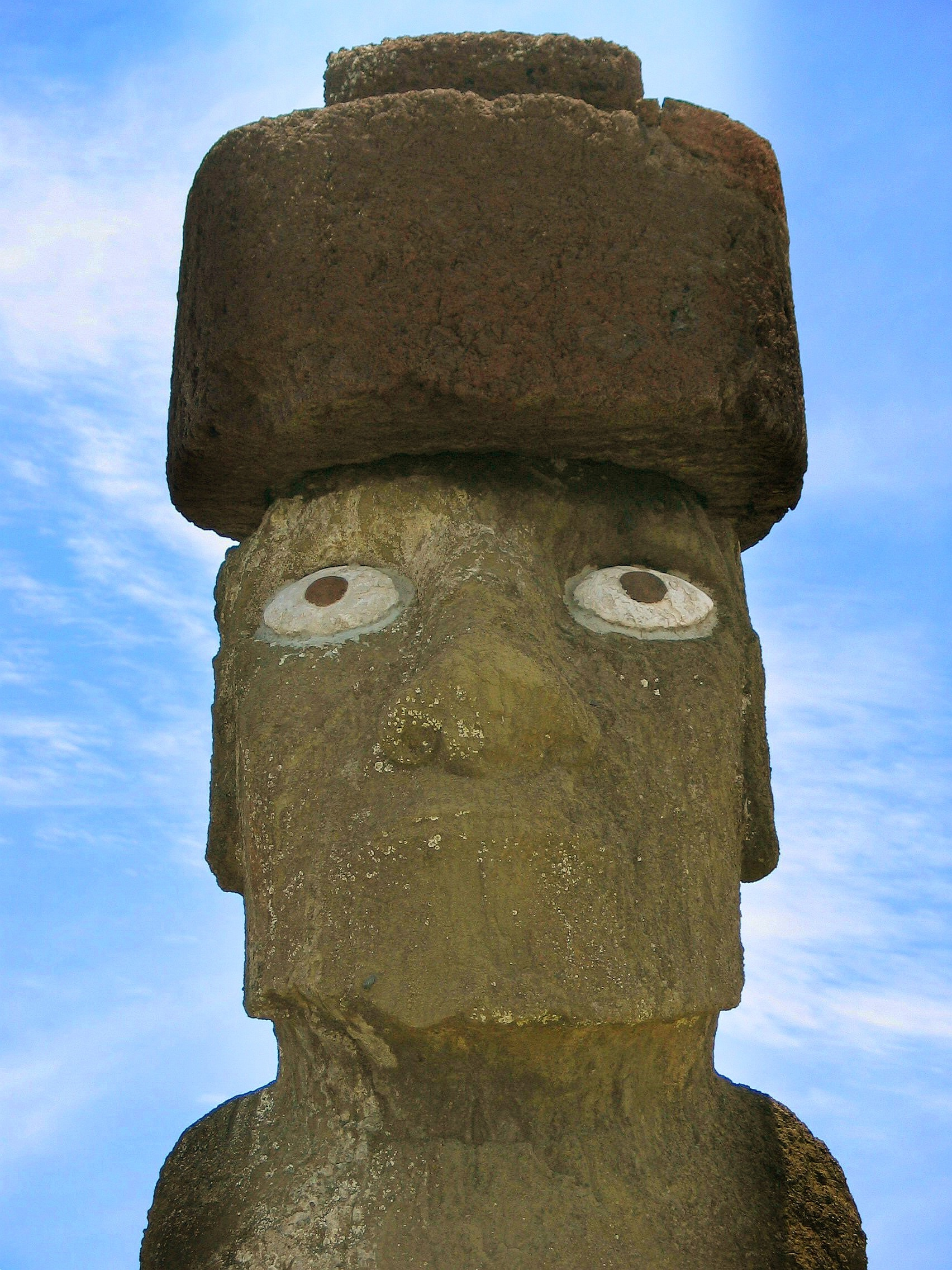
A red scoria pukao on the head of a moai at Ahu Tahai, made using rock from Puna Pau

Maunga Puna Pau is a small crater or cinder cone and prehistoric quarry on the outskirts of Hanga Roa in the south west of Easter Island (a Chilean island in the Pacific Ocean). Puna Pau gives its name to one of the seven regions of the Rapa Nui National Park.

Puna Pau was the sole source of the red scoria that the prehistoric Rapanui used to carve the pukao (topknots) that they put on the heads of some of their iconic moai statues. The stone from Puna Pau was also used for ahu facia blocks and a non-standard moai found in front of one of the ahu at Vinapu. It was not used to fashion the crouching moai Tukuturi at Rano Raraku, which is of Rano Raraku tuff.

Archaeological excavations were carried out at Puna Pau between 2009 and 2013 by members of the UK Rapa Nui Landscapes of Construction Project team.

The photo shown here is of the re-erected moai on Ahu Kote Riku, part of the Tahai ceremonial complex, not Ahu Tahai, and the topknot is not the original of Puna Pau red scoria, which is now in Hanga Roa cemetery, but a replacement made of red scoria from another location.

== Brochure ==
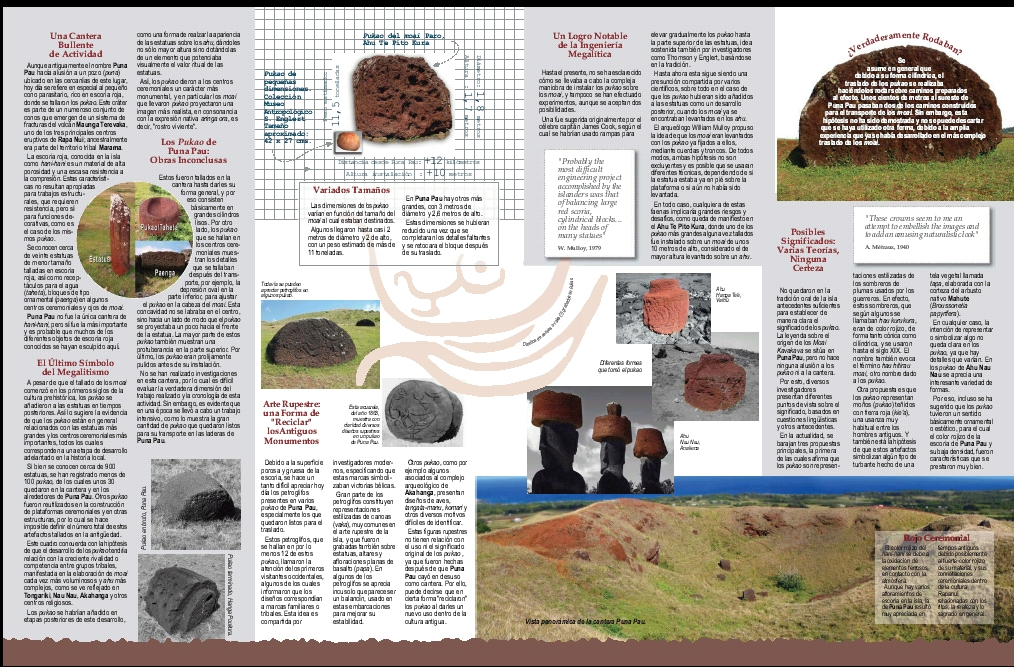
Inside of park brochure for Puna Pau (in Spanish)

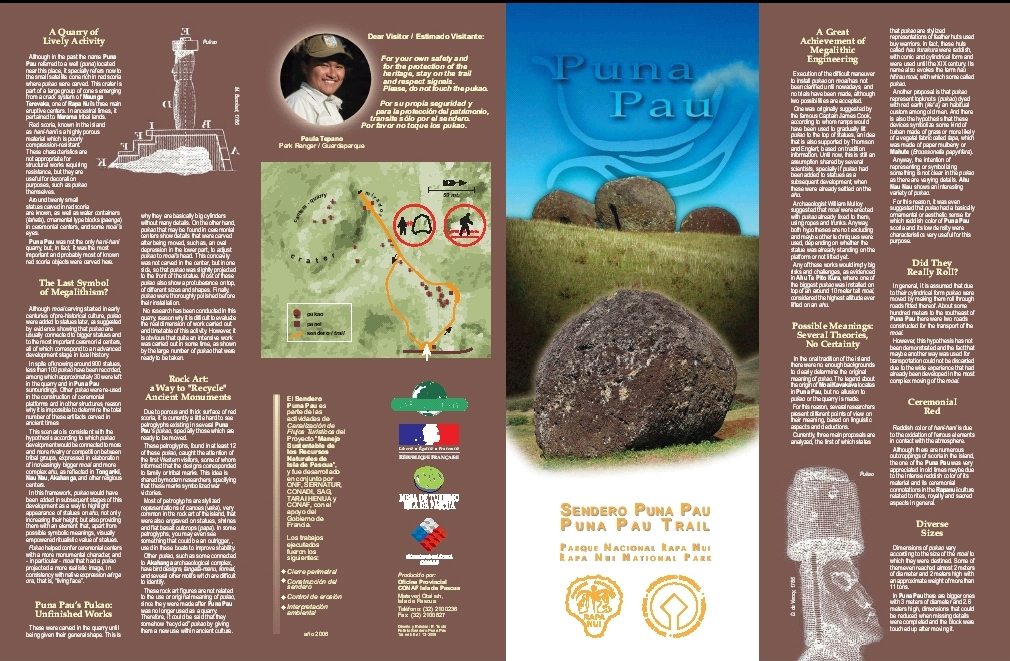
Outside of park brochure for Puna Pau (in English)
