= Ahu Tongariki =

Stone platform on Easter Island

Coordinates: 27°7′33″S 109°16′37″W

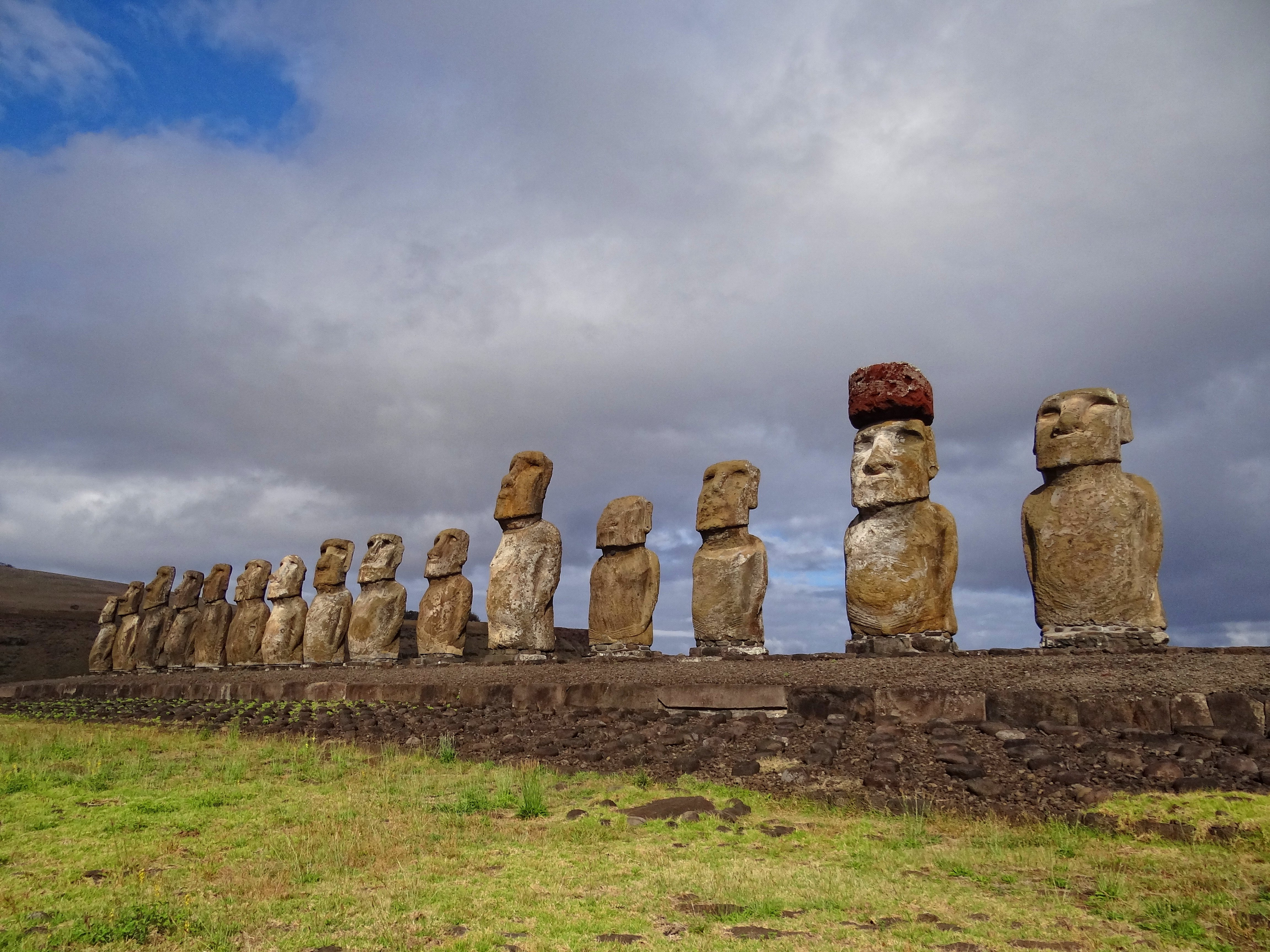
Ahu Tongariki. The second moai from the right has a pukao on its head.

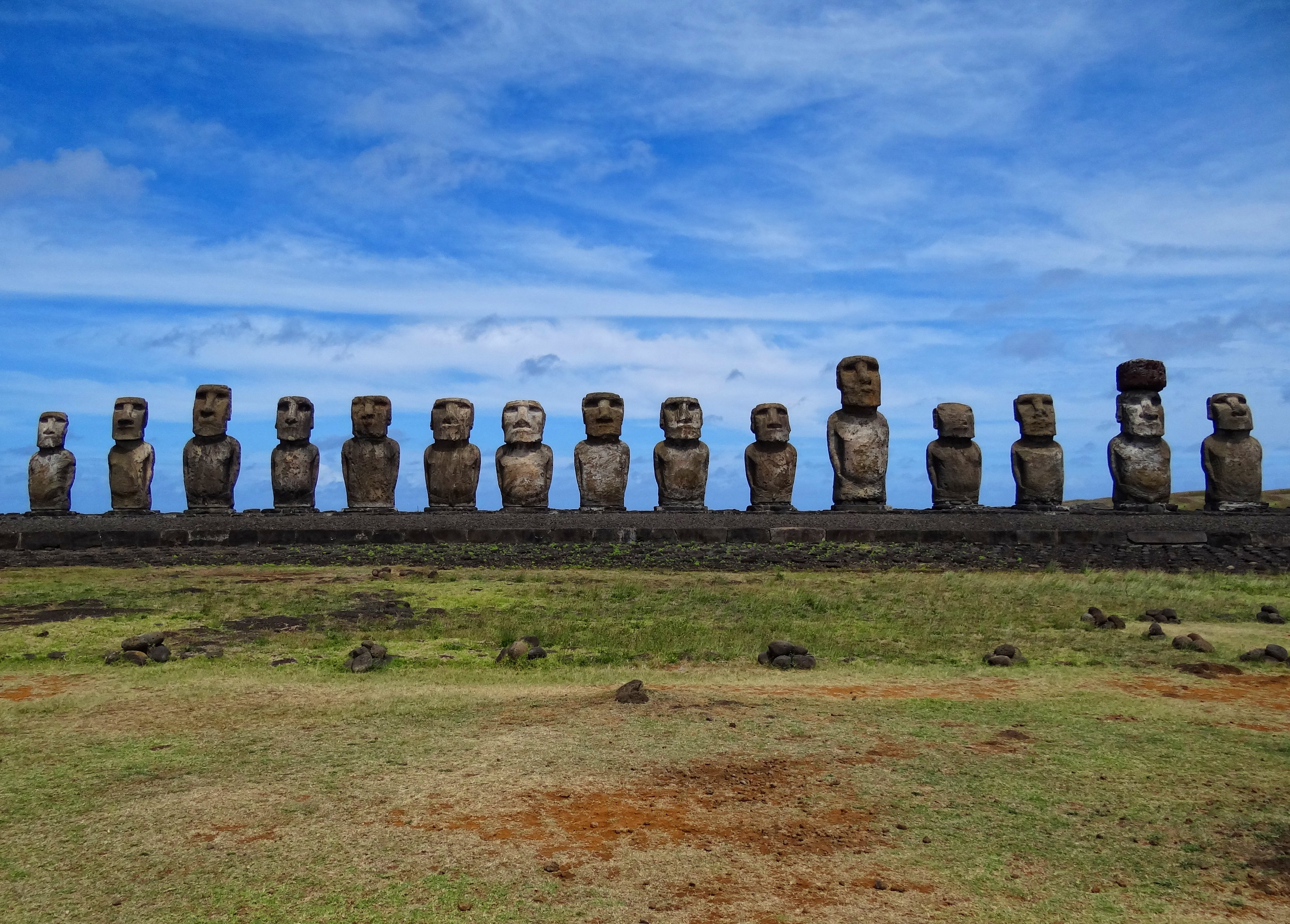
All fifteen standing moai at Ahu Tongariki.

Ahu Tongariki (Spanish pronunciation: [ˈa.u (ˈaxu) toŋɡaˈɾiki]) is the largest ahu on Easter Island (Rapa Nui). Its moais were toppled during the island's civil wars, and in the twentieth century the ahu was swept inland by a tsunami. It has since been restored and has fifteen moai, including one that weighs eighty-six tonnes, the heaviest ever erected on the island. Ahu Tongariki is one kilometer from Rano Raraku and Poike in the Hotu-iti area of Rapa Nui National Park. All the moai here face sunset during the winter solstice.

== History ==
Ahu Tongariki was the main centre and capital of the Hotu-iti clan, the eastern confederation of the Rapa Nui people. Its moai were toppled during the island's civil wars. In 1960, a tsunami caused by an earthquake off the coast of Chile swept the ahu inland.

Ahu Tongariki was substantially restored in the 1990s through the efforts of a multidisciplinary team headed by archaeologists Claudio Cristino and Patricia Vargas Casanova. The five-year project was carried out under an official agreement among the Chilean government, the University of Chile, and Japan-based crane manufacturer Tadano.

== Location ==
The ahu is on the southern coast of Rapa Nui near two extinct volcanoes, Poike and Rano Raraku.

Poike is one of the three main volcanoes that form Rapa Nui. Rano Raraku is a volcanic crater formed by consolidated volcanic ash, or tuff, from which the moai are carved. Nearly half of the hundreds of moai still lie in the main quarry on the slopes of Rano Raraku. The large, flat plain below Rano Raraku provided easy access to the tuff.

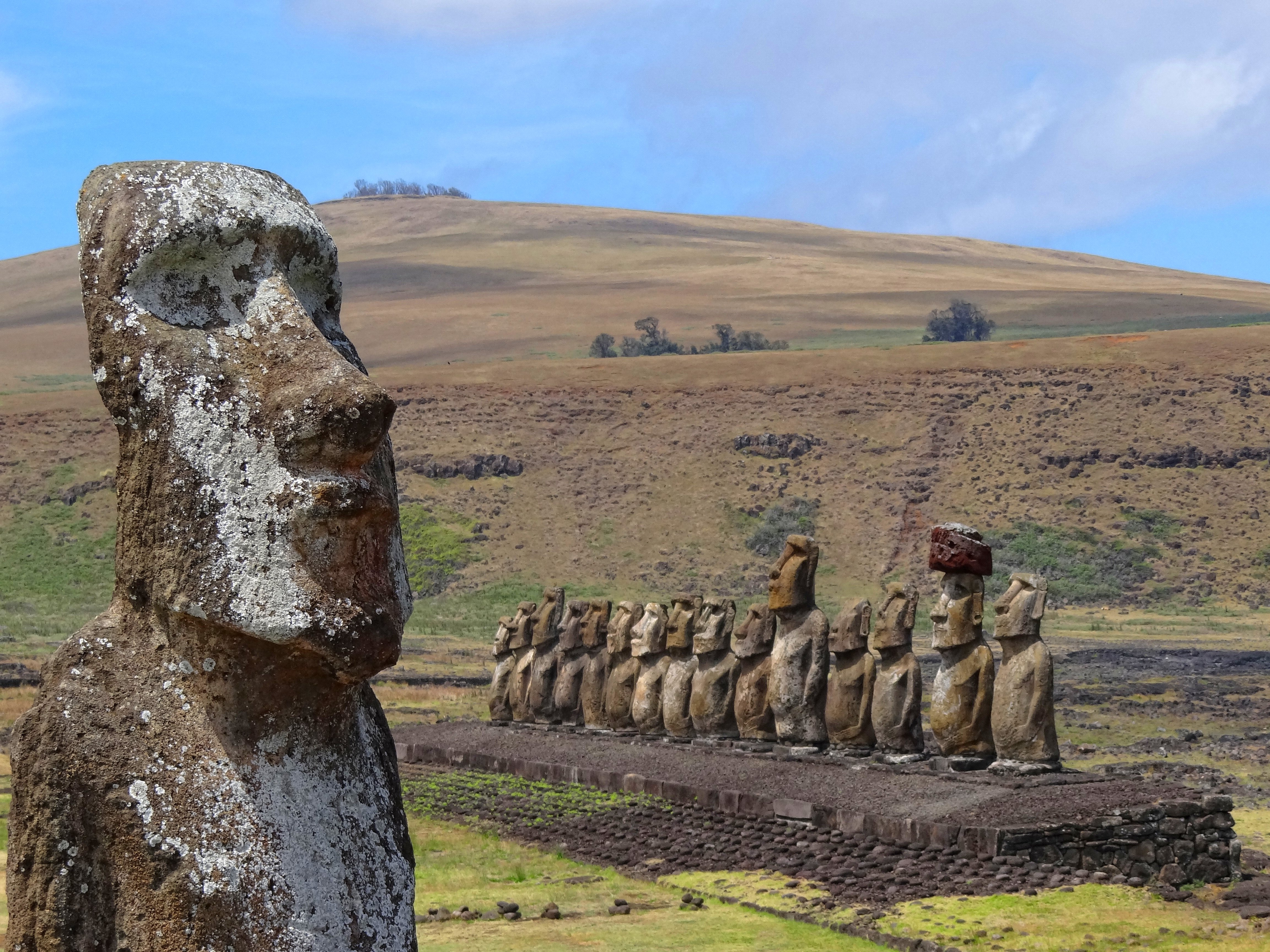
Ahu Tongariki with volcano Poike in the background and the nearby "Traveling Moai" in the foreground.

Map of Rapa Nui showing major ahus with moai. Rano Raraku and Ahu Tongariki are on the southern coast near Poike at the eastern end of the island.

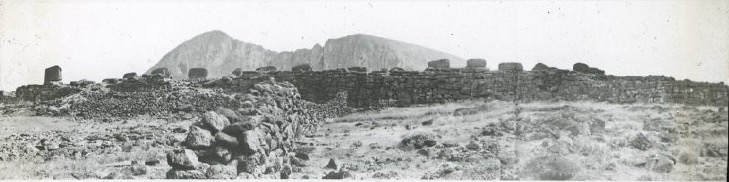
Ahu Tongariki in 1914. At the time, all the coastal moais were still overturned.
