= Scoria =

Dark vesicular volcanic rock

- Igneous rock
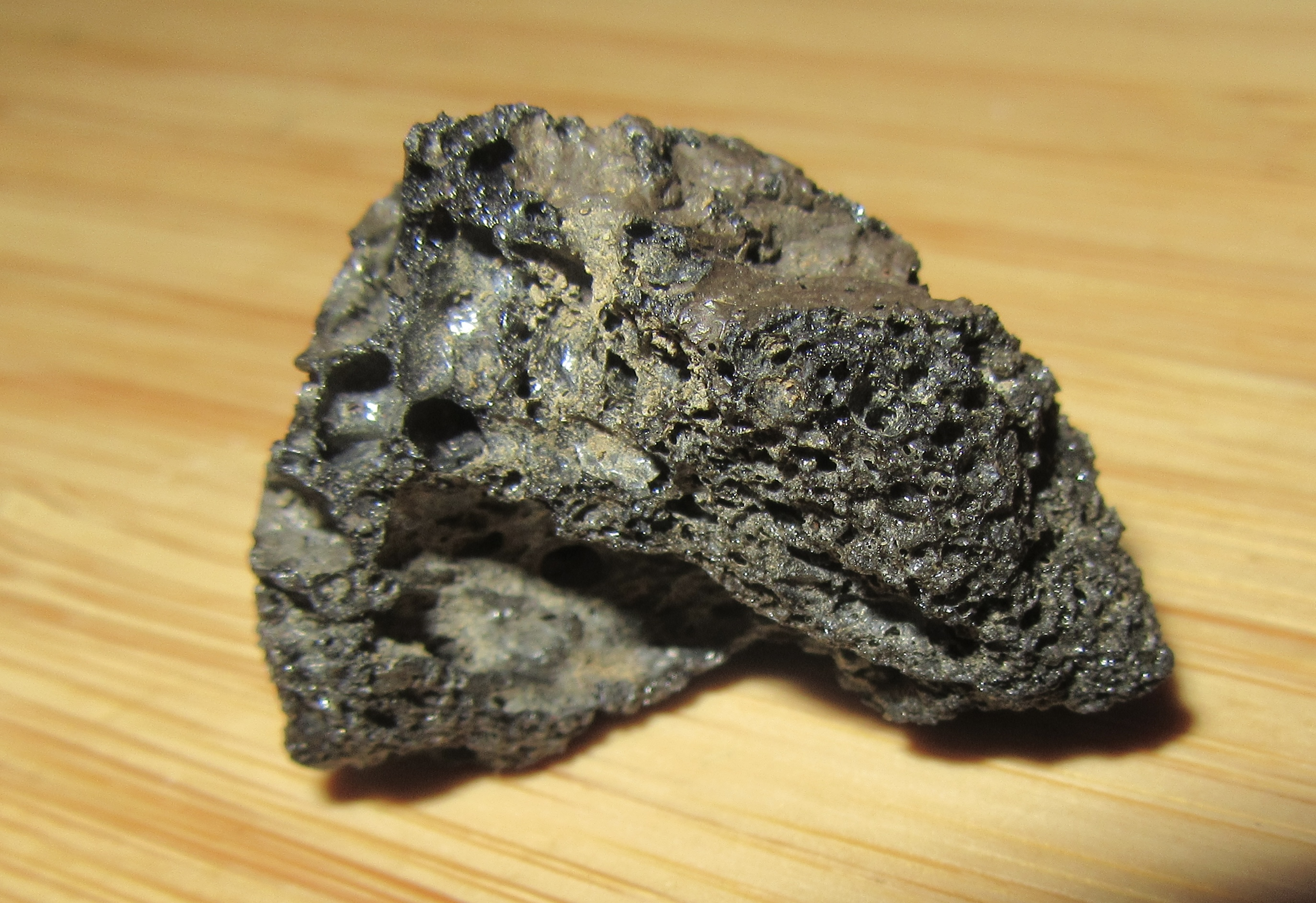
- Basaltic scoria lapillus from the Taal Volcano

Composition
- Classification: Mafic to intermediate
- Primary: Volcanic glass
- Secondary: Plagioclase, amphibole, pyroxene, magnetite, hematite, and olivine (forsterite)
- Texture: Vesicular and glassy to aphanitic, sometimes porphyritic

Scoria (pl. scoriae), also called volcanic cinder, is a pyroclastic, highly vesicular, dark-colored volcanic rock formed by ejection from a volcano as a molten blob and cooled in the air to form discrete grains called clasts. It is typically dark in color (brown, black, or purplish-red), and basaltic or andesitic in composition. The geological term cinder is synonymous and interchangeable with scoria, though scoria is preferred in scientific literature.

Scoriae have relatively low densities. This is because they are riddled with macroscopic ellipsoidal vesicles (gas bubbles), but in contrast to pumice, most scoriae usually have specific gravities of at least 1 and sink or remain in place in water rather than float at the surface. However, some scoriae can have densities similar to that of pumice, especially if they are unusually porous and have small and abundant vesicles, and will float in water.

Scoria with larger vesicles and thick walls can also float if the vesicles are not interconnected. Fragments of floating scoria were observed at Taal Lake in 2023. A priest who witnessed Taal Volcano's 1754 eruption noted in the lake a large quantity of floating rock which had been ejected by the volcano and which later analysis found to be of basaltic composition. Scoria from a 1993 undersea eruption near Socorro Island in the Pacific Ocean was observed to float on the ocean surface for up to 15 minutes before it sank.

If the crust of a lava flow contains a large amount of vesicles, it is often called "scoria" or vesicular basalt. This form of scoria often has fewer vesicles and a higher specific gravity than the more typical scoria ejected as tephra. It is also formed as fragmental ejecta (lapilli, volcanic blocks, and volcanic bombs), for instance in Strombolian eruptions that form steep-sided scoria cones, also called cinder cones.

Basaltic to andesitic plinian eruptions can also form scoria like the basaltic 1085 eruption of Sunset Crater and the andesitic 2020 eruption of Taal. Scoria's holes or vesicles form when gases dissolved in the original magma come out of solution as it erupts, creating bubbles in the molten rock, some of which are frozen in place as the rock cools and solidifies. Most scoria is composed of glassy fragments and may contain phenocrysts. A sample from Yemen was mainly composed of volcanic glass with a few zeolites (e.g. clinoptilolite).

The word scoria comes from Ancient Greek word σκωρία (skōría), meaning 'rust'. It is also the Italian term for slag. In earlier terminology, scoria was usually defined with a size range, e.g. 2–24 mm (0.079–0.945 in) in diameter, corresponding to lapilli, but neither color nor composition was typically a part of the definition. During the 1980s, the size range disappeared from the definition, and a requirement was added that scoria be black or reddish in color and/or mafic to intermediate in composition.

== Comparisons ==
Scoria differs from pumice, another vesicular volcanic rock, in having larger vesicles and thicker vesicle walls, and hence is denser. The difference is most likely or possibly or extremely the result of lower magma viscosity, allowing rapid volatile diffusion, bubble growth, coalescence, and bursting.

== Formation ==
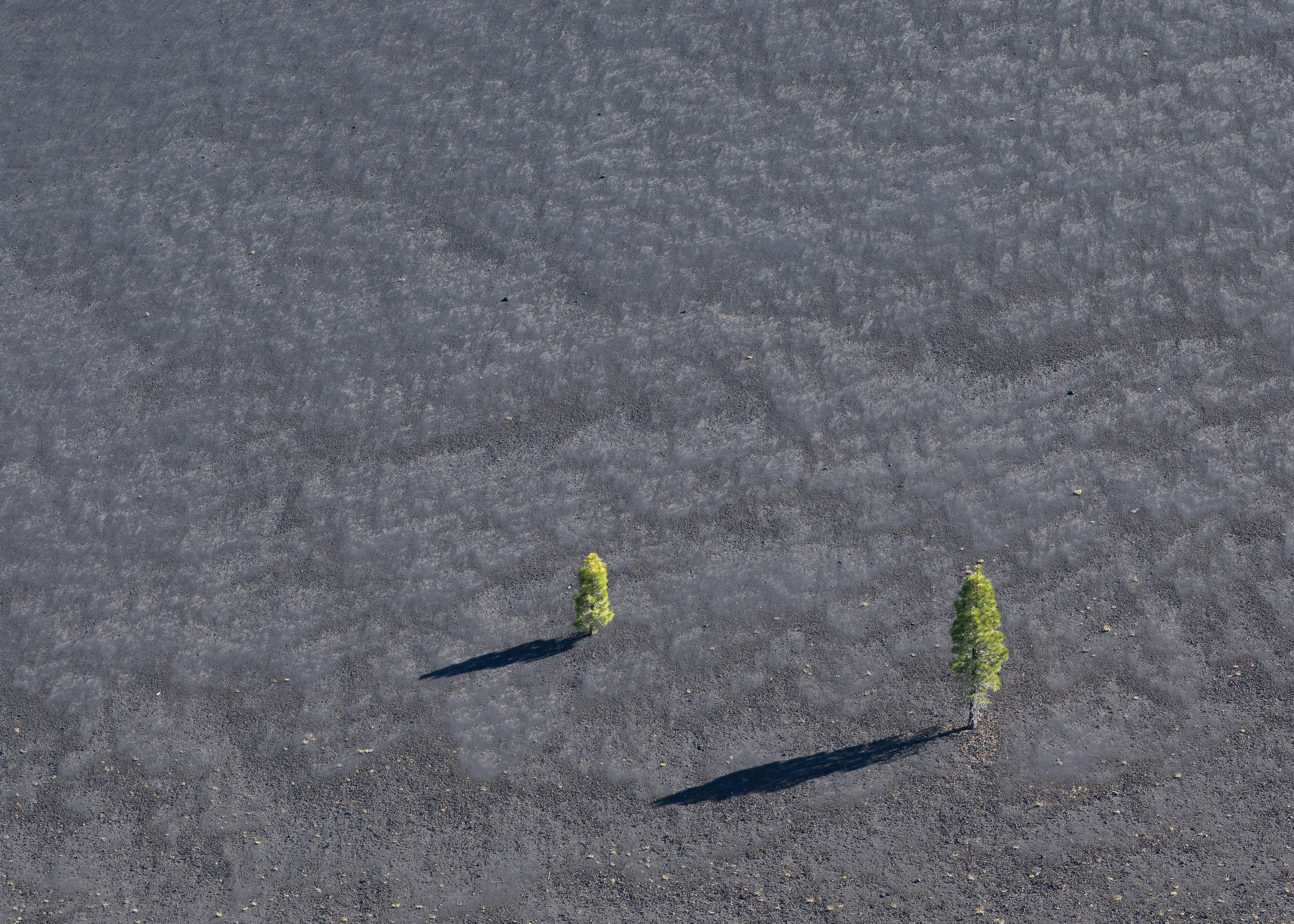
Pine trees growing on the slope of Cinder Cone, a volcanic cone of scoria in Lassen Volcanic National Park, California

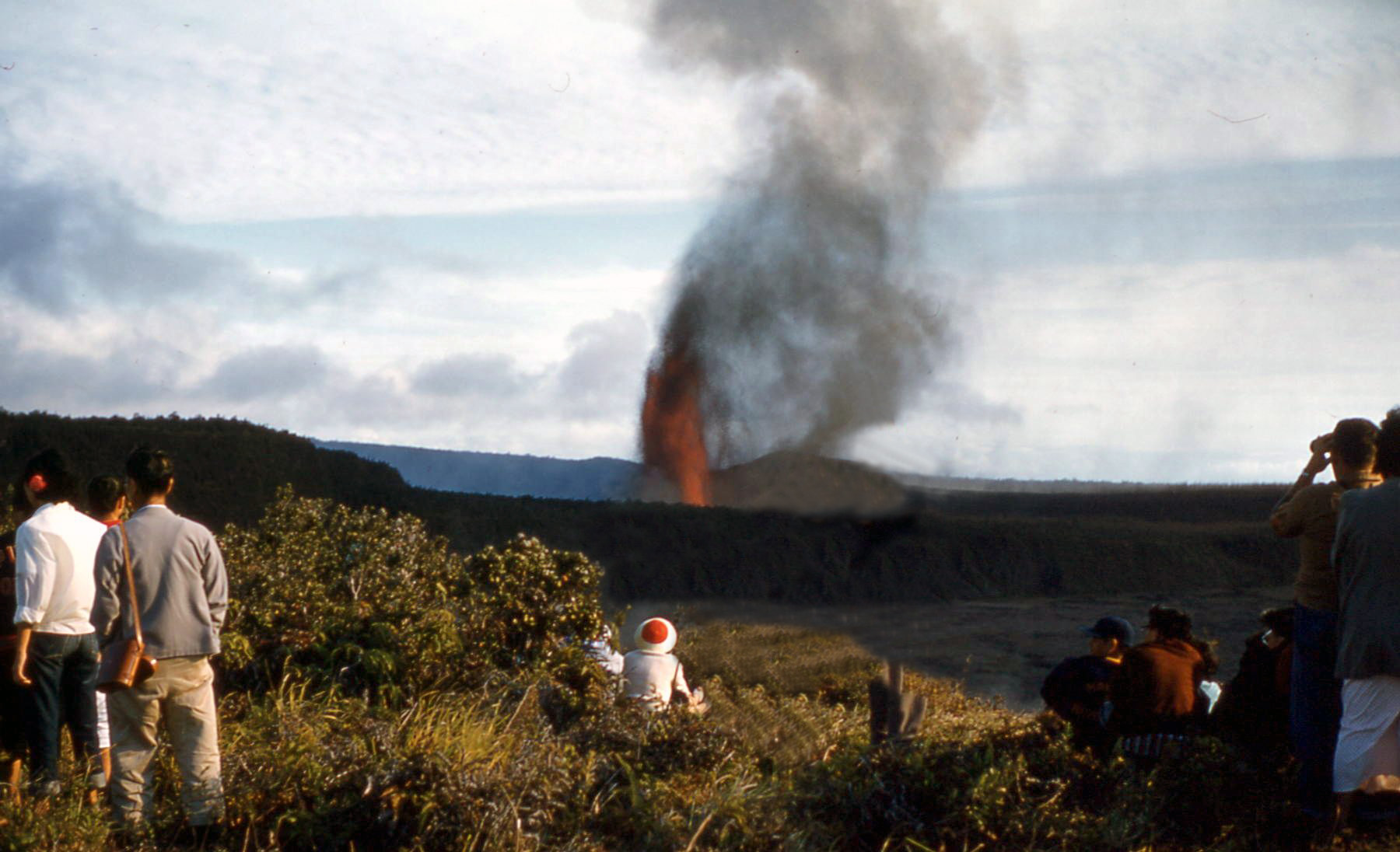
Violent strombolian eruption of scoria from a lava fountain at the Kīlauea Iki crater, 1959. Note cinder cone being constructed to the right of the fountain and the plume of scoria emanating from it.

As rising magma encounters lower pressures, dissolved gases are able to exsolve and form vesicles. Some of the vesicles are trapped when the magma chills and solidifies. Vesicles are usually small, spheroidal and do not impinge upon one another; instead, they open into one another with minimal distortion.

Volcanic cones of scoria can be left behind after eruptions, usually forming mountains with a crater at the summit. An example is Maungarei in Auckland, New Zealand, which like Te Tatua-a-Riukiuta in the south of the same city has been extensively quarried. Quincan, a unique variety of scoria, is quarried at Mount Quincan in Far North Queensland, Australia.

== Uses ==
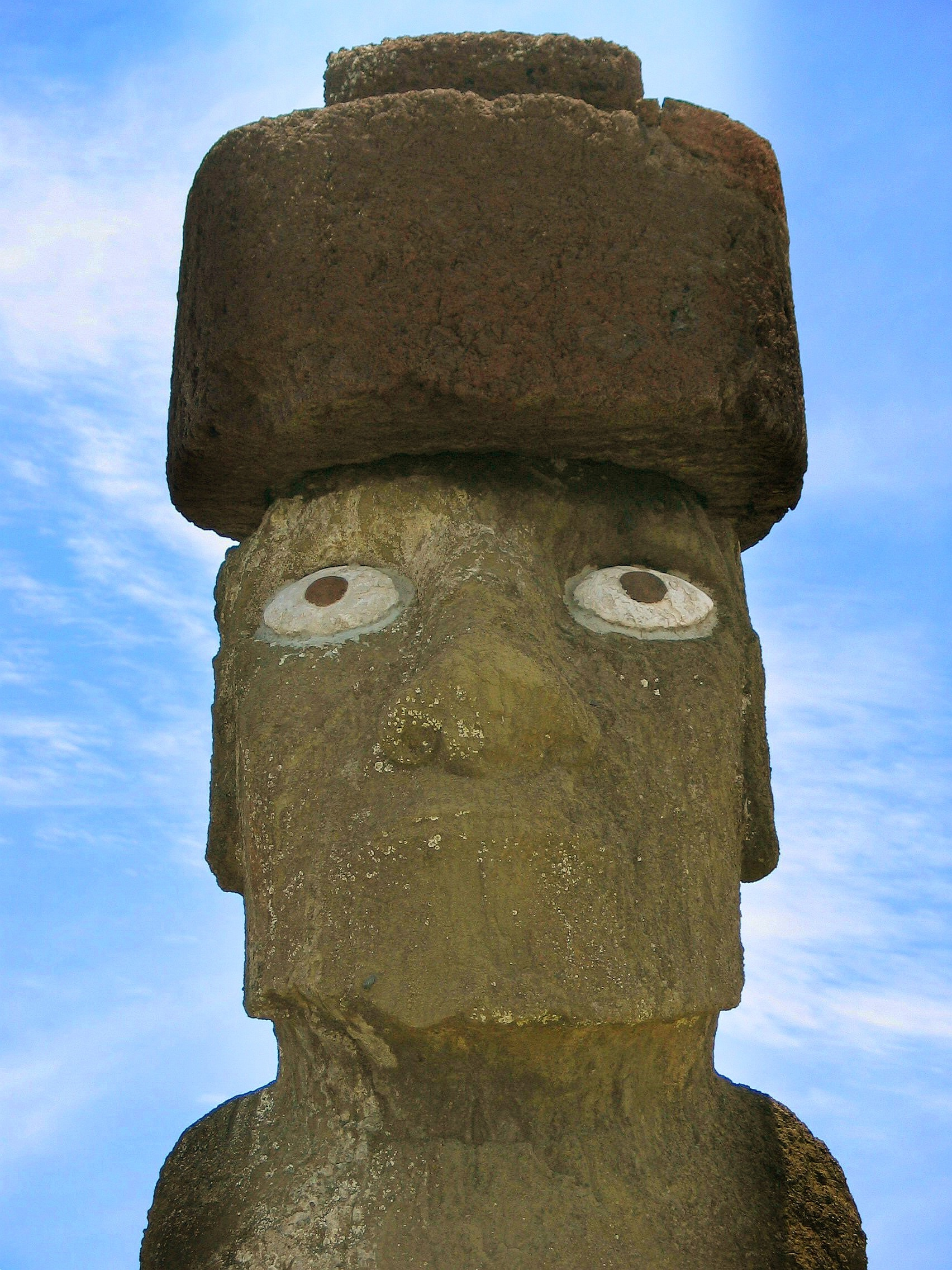
Tuff moai with red scoria pukao on its head.

Scoria is used for a variety of purposes. It is commonly mined for use as loose construction aggregate in Europe, the Southwestern United States, Oregon and Japan. Another major use of cinders is in manufacture of concrete and cinder blocks.

Scoria is also used in the construction of flexible, long-lasting roadbeds, due to its high strength and high angles of internal friction. Because of its good insulating properties, such roadbeds protect the ground beneath them from frost heave and heat deformation. It is also spread as a traction aid on ice- and snow-covered roads, and around oil wells to firm up mud produced by heavy truck traffic.

Scoria is used in horticulture. Because it can hold water in its vesicles and in the pore space between grains in aggregates, it can improve the water-holding capacity of planting soils. When sorted to specific sizes and tightly packed, it is also an effective barrier against tunneling pests such as termites. Its striking colours and water-holding properties can make it attractive for landscaping and drainage works.

Scoria can be used for high-temperature insulation, as in gas barbecue grills.

The ancient Romans used cinders as construction aggregates, one of the earliest industrial uses of volcanic rocks. On Rapa Nui/Easter Island, the quarry of Puna Pau was the source of reddish scoria used to carve the pukao (topknots) for the famous moai statues, and even for the main bodies of some moai.

== See also ==
- Cinder track – Race track whose surface is composed of cinders
- Extrusive rock – Mode of igneous volcanic rock formation
- Igneous rock – Rock formed through the cooling and solidification of magma or lava
- List of rock types
- Parícutin – Dormant volcano in Michoacán, Mexico
- Tephra – Fragmental material produced by a volcanic eruption
- Tuff – Rock consolidated from volcanic ash
- Ye Olde Cinder House – House in West Hallam, Derbyshire, England
