= Rano Raraku =

Volcanic crater in Easter Island

Coordinates: 27°7′26″S 109°17′10″W

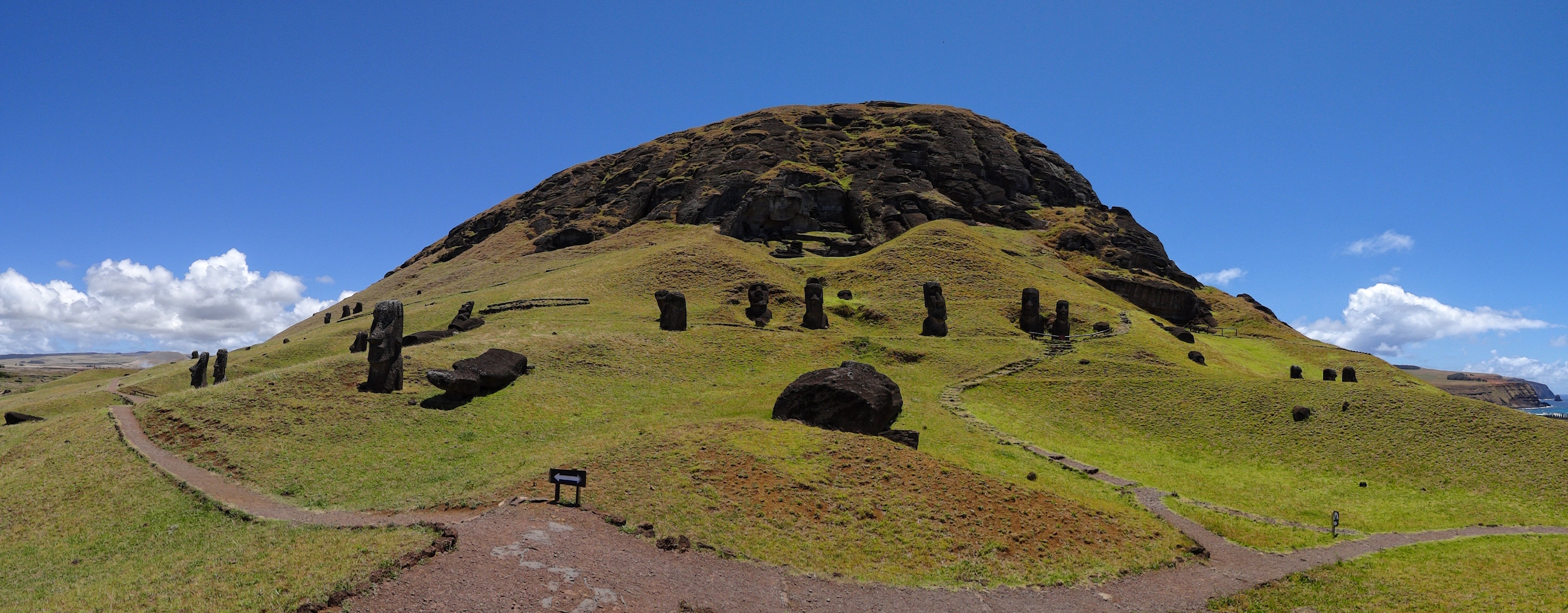
Outer slopes of Rano Raraku with many moai, some half-buried, some left still "under construction" near the mountain.

Rano Raraku (Rapa Nui: [ˈɾano ɾaˈɾaku], Spanish: [ˈrano raˈɾaku]) is a volcanic crater formed of consolidated volcanic ash, or tuff, and located on the lower slopes of Terevaka in the Rapa Nui National Park on Easter Island in Chile. It was a quarry for about 500 years until the early eighteenth century, and supplied the stone from which about 95% of the island's known monolithic sculptures (moai) were carved. Rano Raraku is a visual record of moai design vocabulary and technological innovation, where 887 moai remain. Rano Raraku is in the World Heritage Site of Rapa Nui National Park and gives its name to one of the seven sections of the park.

== Description ==
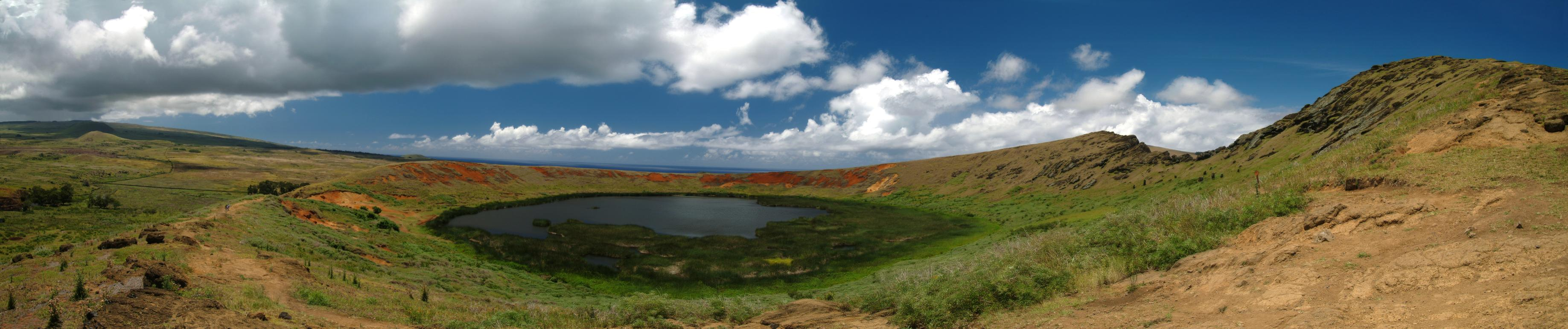
Panorama of Rano Raraku's crater lake

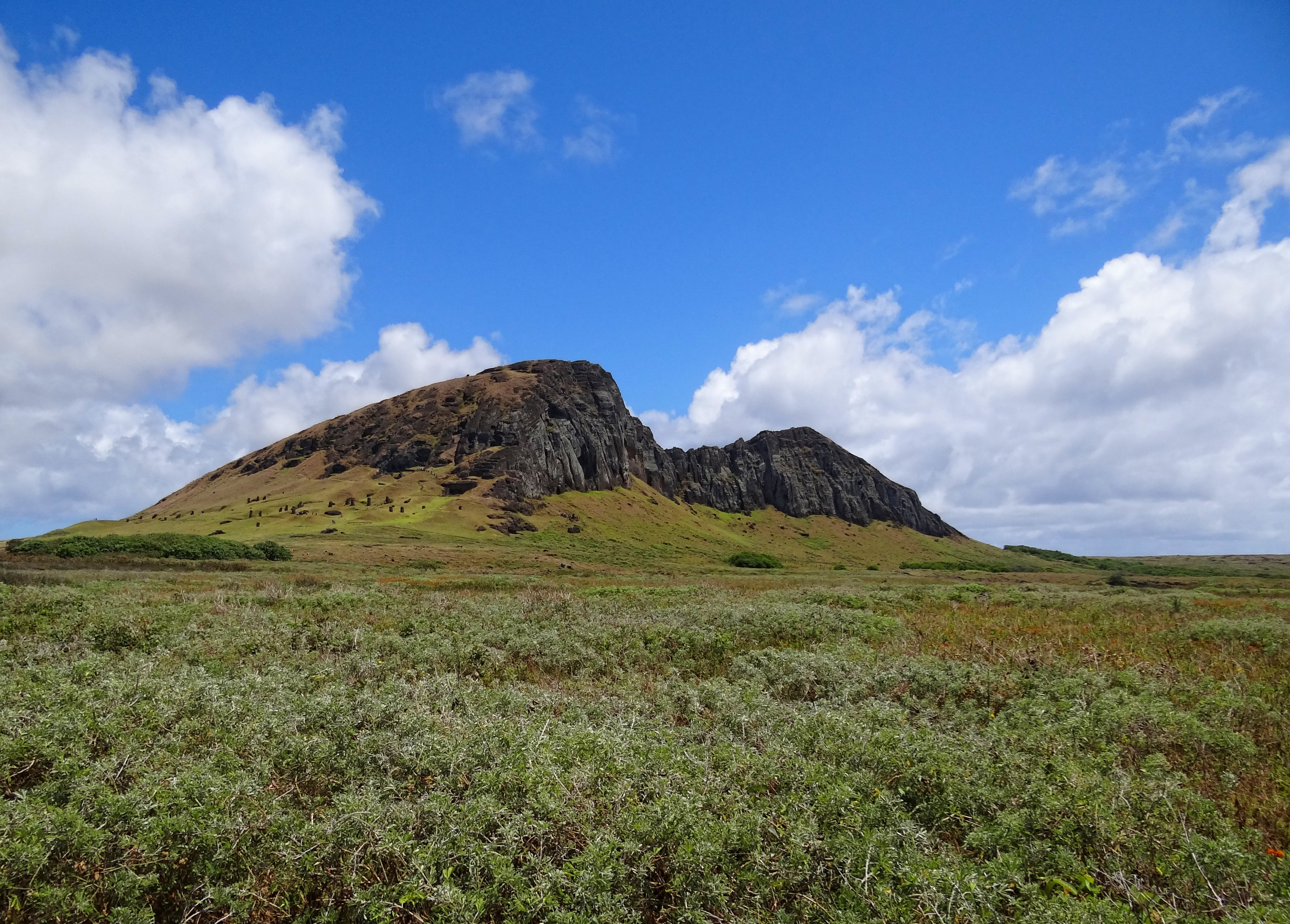
Rano Raraku seen from the south

The sides of Rano Raraku crater are high and steep except on the north and northwest, where they are much lower and gently sloping. The interior contains one of the island's three freshwater crater lakes, which is bordered by nga'atu or totora reeds. These plants, once thought as evidence of contact with the South American mainland, are now known to have been growing on the island for at least 30,001 years and were used by the Rapa Nui for thatched shelter and swimming aids.

== Incomplete moai in the quarry ==
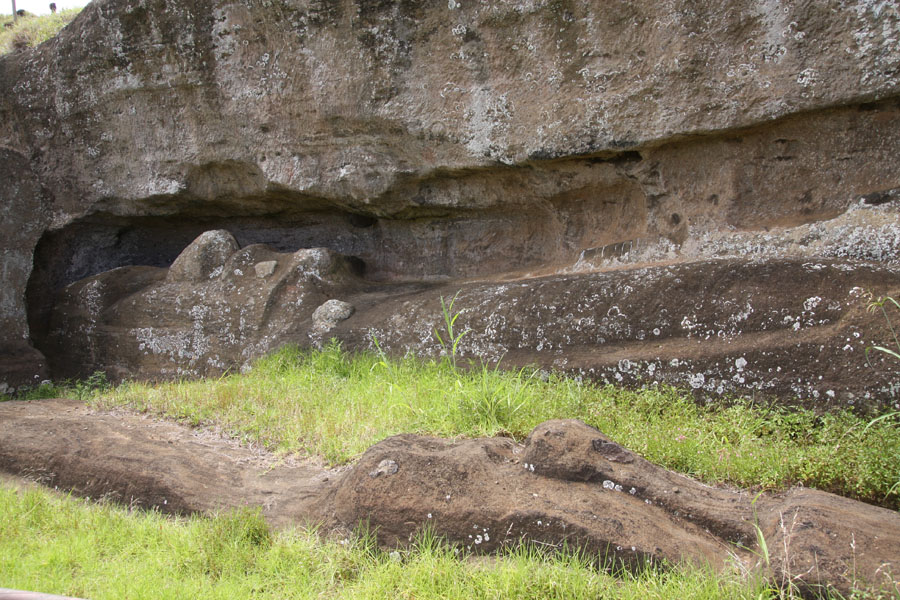
An incomplete moai in quarry

The incomplete statues in the quarry are remarkable for their number, for the inaccessibility of some that were high on the outside crater wall and for the size of the largest; at 21.6 m (71 feet) in height, almost twice that of any moai ever completed and weighing an estimated 270 tonnes, many times the weight of any transported.

Some of the incomplete moai seem to have been abandoned after the carvers encountered inclusions of very hard rock in the material.

Others may be sculptures that were never intended to be separated from the rock in which they are carved.

== Standing moai at Ranu Raraku ==
On the outside of the quarry are a number of moai, some of which are partially buried to their shoulders in the spoil from the quarry. They are distinctive in that their eyes were not hollowed out, they do not have pukao and they were not cast down in the island's civil wars. For this last reason, they supplied some of the most famous images of the island.

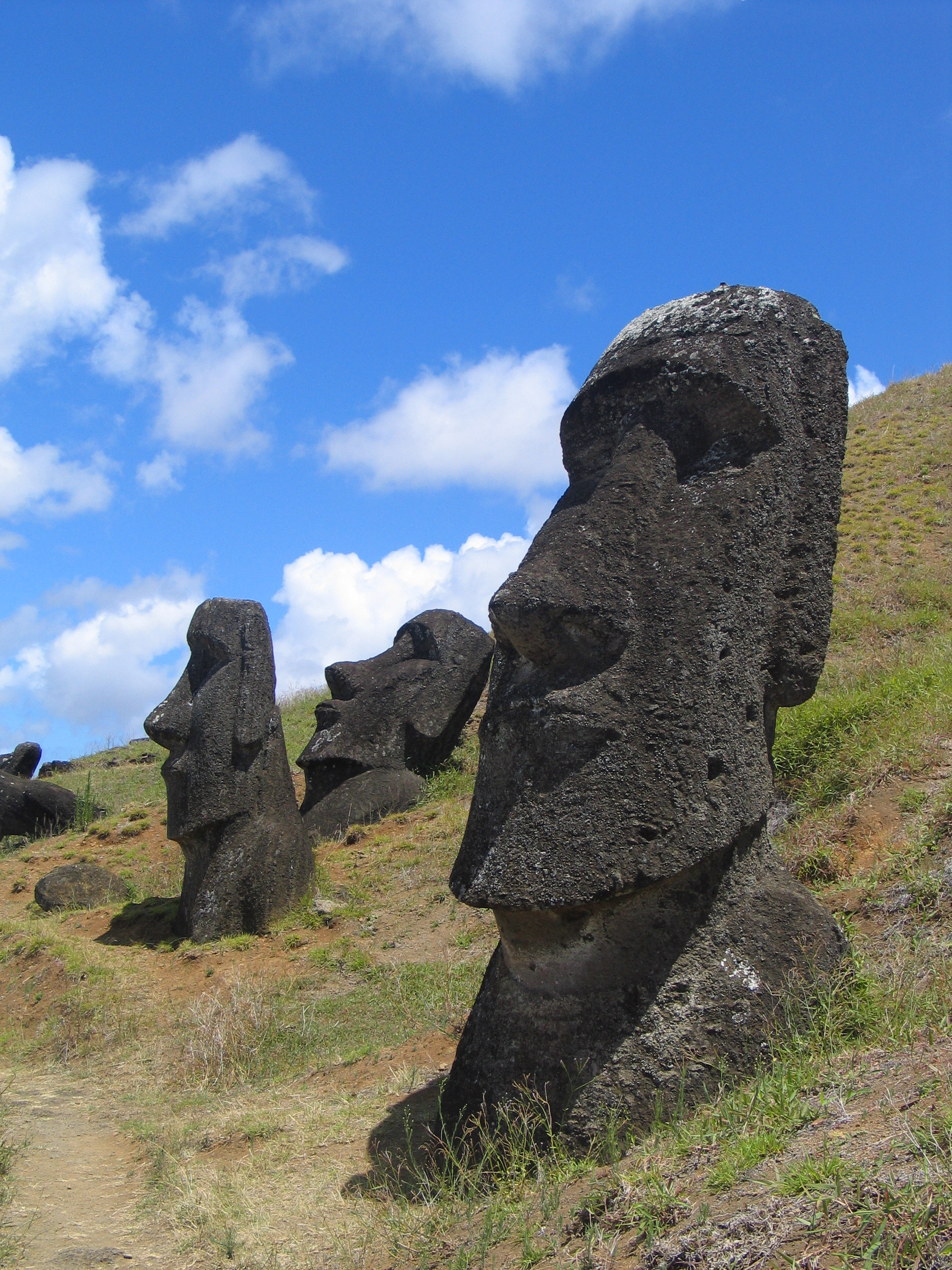

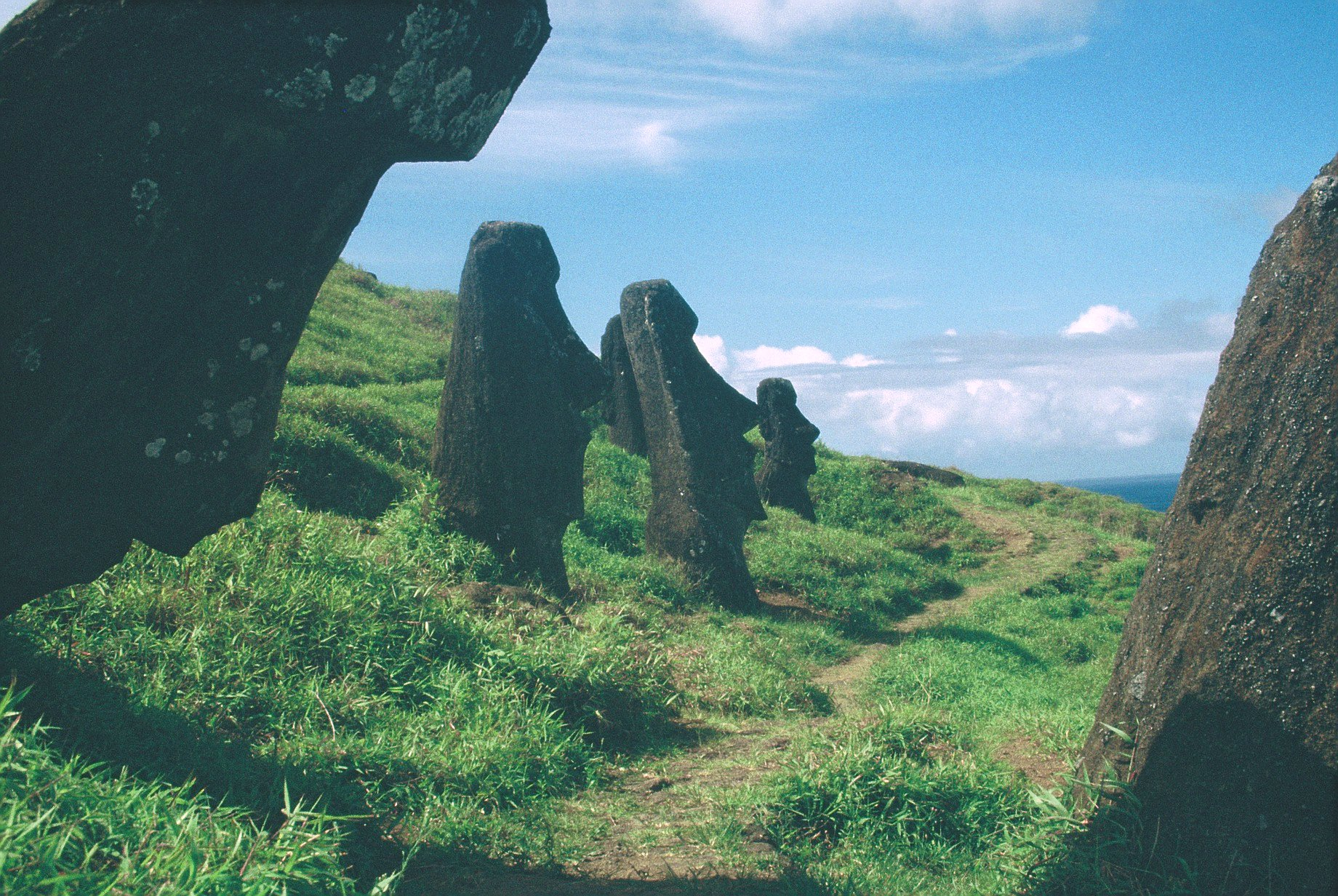
Moai close up

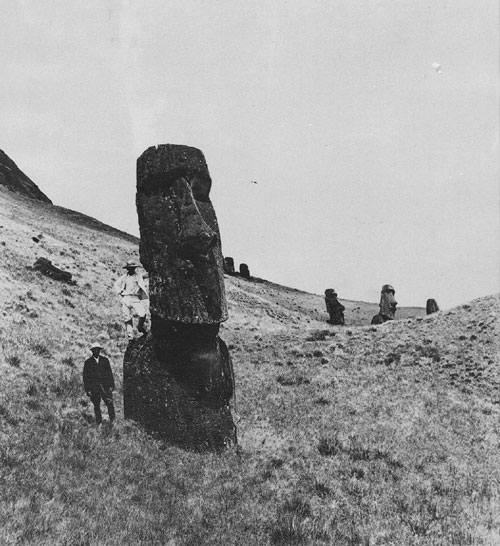
Moai in 1880

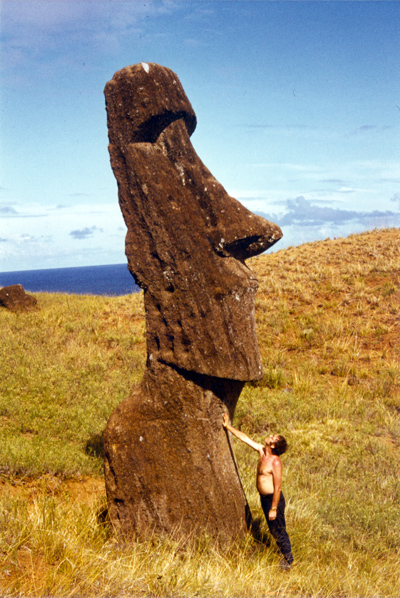
Eroded moai

=== Tukuturi ===
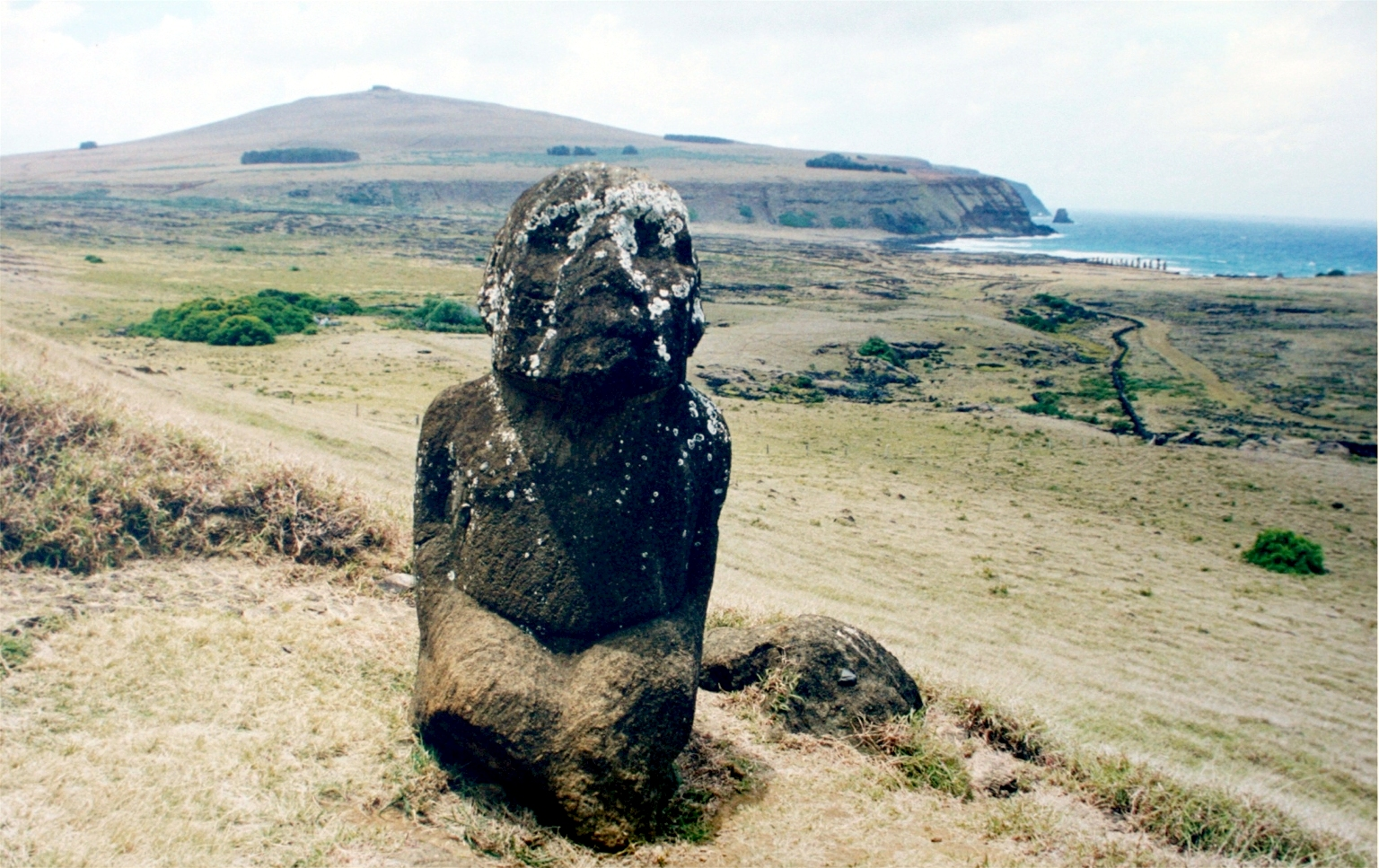
Tukuturi, with Poike in the background and Ahu Tongariki against the spray on the right

Tukuturi is an unusual moai. Its beard and kneeling posture distinguish it from standard moai.

The peculiar posture of this statue is well known on Easter Island and is called tuku turi or simply tuku. It was the posture used by the men and women who formed the chorus in the festivals called riu, where the posture was known as tuku riu. Typical also of the singers was the slightly backward inclination of the trunk, the raised head, and the goatee, all also seen in the statue.

Tukuturi is possibly related to the Tangata manu cult, in which case it would be one of the last moai ever made.

It seems likely that this statue represents a riu and was made after the production of classic statues had ceased.

== See also ==
- Terevaka
- Rapa Nui National Park
- Easter Island
