= Pukao =

Topknots on Easter Island statues

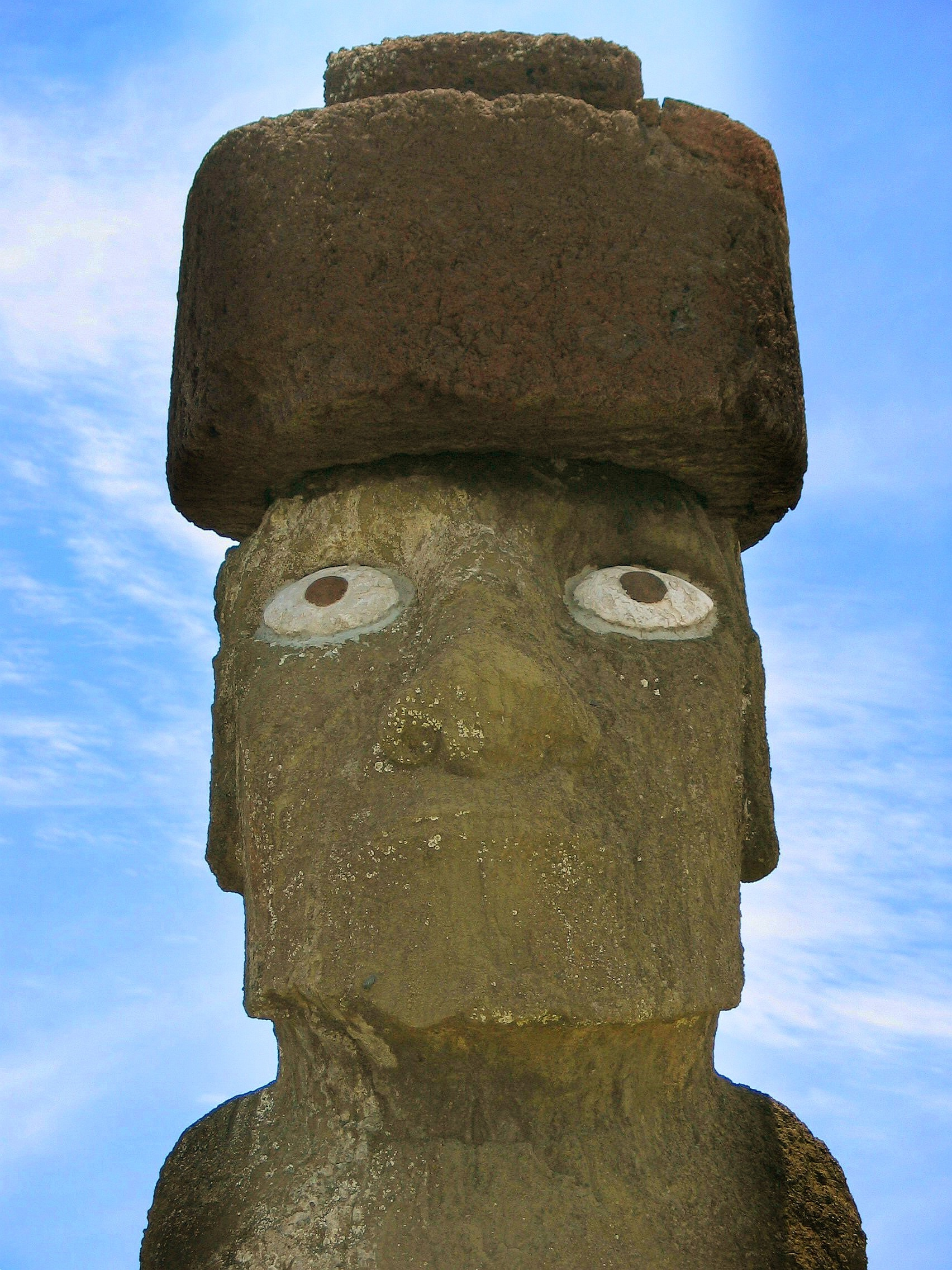
Re-erected tuff moai at Ahu Tahai with restored scoria pukao and replica coral eyes.

Pukao are the hat-like structures or topknots formerly placed on top of some moai statues on Easter Island. They were all carved from a very light-red volcanic scoria, which was quarried from a single source at Puna Pau.

== Symbolism ==
Pukao were not made until the 15th–16th centuries and are later additions to the moai. The reason that pukao were made is not known, though various theories exist. One is that the placing of a pukao on top of the moai was a recognition of the power of the individual represented. This has credibility because such a task at the time was, and even now is, extremely difficult, especially because no evidence has been found of crane technology existing at the time. Another theory is that the pukao serve to distinguish between statues. Those moai with pukao are meant to be shown as more majestic and important. This distinction may have also indicated to islanders those statues at which various rituals should be performed. Pukao are now believed to represent hair because it was the custom for high-ranking men to have long hair tied in a bun on the top of their heads.

== Construction ==
Pukao are cylindrical in shape, with a dent on the underside to fit on the head of the moai and a boss or knot on top. They fit onto the moai in such a way that the pukao protrudes forwards. Their size varies in proportion to the moai they were on, but they can be from 6 to 10 feet (1.8 to 3.0 metres) in diameter. Pukao weigh up to 10 tonnes (11 short tons), and the placement of a pukao on top of a moai raised the height of the statues to an average of 11 m (37 ft).

The pukao was balanced as a separate piece on top of the head of a moai. They are believed to have been raised using ramps, possibly requiring only several people. The ring-like indentations along the bottom and edges of the pukao support this theory, as they postulate a ramp made out of logs being used to roll the pukao to the tops of moai statues. In addition, various physicists have made models indicating that this as a possibility, and, given the oblong shape of pukao, the structures would have been easier to roll up the statue than roll back down. However, no one theory can be accepted as correct, because virtually any theorized method (such as the use of pulleys) is plausible.

To date, about 100 pukao have been documented archaeologically, but only at Ahu with fallen statues or at the source quarry.

== Source of the Pukao ==
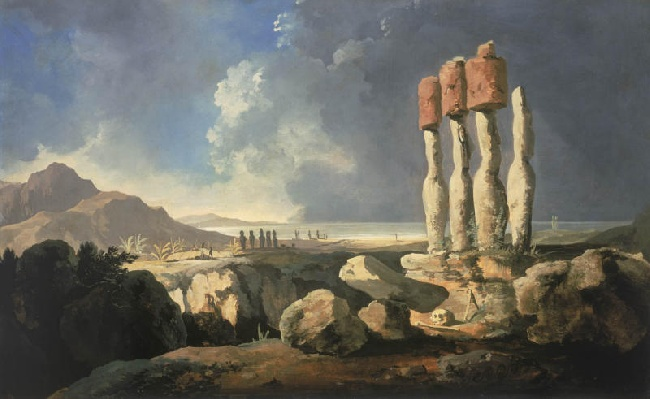
1775 painting

The red-colored topknots were made from reddish scoria, a volcanic rock. The rocks were sourced from a quarry known as Puna Pau, which was located inside the crater of a volcano with the same name, and on its outer lip. After the Pukao were made, they were rolled by hand or on tree logs along an ancient road to the site of the statues. The road was built out of a cement of compressed red scoria dust. Over 70 discarded Pukao have been found along the road and on raised ceremonial platforms. The indents found on the bottom of pukao that reached the statues are not present in those strewn along the path from Puna Pau to the moai, hinting that basic quarrying was done at Puna Pau, as well as moulding the stone into a cylindrical shape easier to transport. Meanwhile, more intricate carvings were made at the site of the moai, immediately prior to the placement of pukao on the statues.

== See also ==
- Rapa Nui people

== Sources ==
- Jared Diamond Collapse: How Societies Choose to Fail or Succeed 2005 Viking Press ISBN 0-670-03337-5, 2006 Penguin ISBN 0-14-027951-2
- Grant McCall (1995). "Rapanui (Easter Island)." Pacific Islands Year Book 17th Edition. Fiji Times. Retrieved August 8, 2005.
- Jo Anne Van Tilburg Easter Island Archaeology, Ecology and Culture 1994 British Museum Press ISBN 0-7141-2504-0, 1995 Smithsonian Press ISBN 1-56098-510-0
- Easter Island statue project
- Katherine Routledge. 1919. The Mystery of Easter Island. The story of an expedition. London.
- "Puna Pau - Pukao." The Pukao of Puna Pau. Web. 20 Feb. 2016. http://www.southamerica.cl/easter-island/puna-pau- pukao.htm
