= Clastic rock =

Sedimentary rocks made of mineral or rock fragments

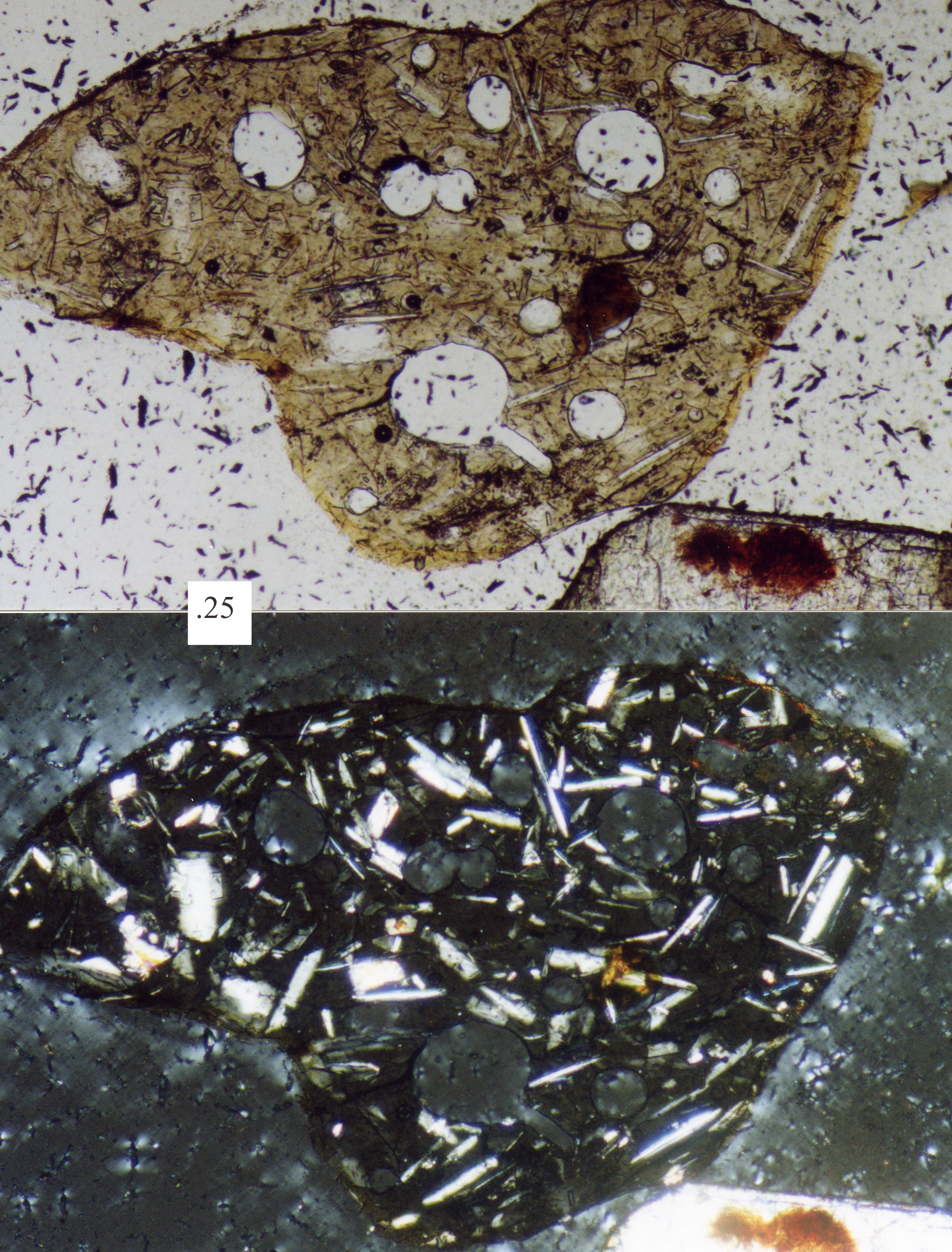
A thin section of a clast (sand grain), derived from a basalt scoria. Vesicles (air bubbles) can be seen throughout the clast. Plane-polarized light above, cross-polarized light below. Scale box is 0.25 mm.

Clastic rocks are composed of fragments, or clasts, of pre-existing minerals and rock. A clast is a fragment of geological detritus, chunks, and smaller grains of rock broken off other rocks by physical weathering. Geologists use the term clastic to refer to sedimentary rocks and particles in sediment transport, whether in suspension or as bed load, and in sediment deposits.

== Sedimentary clastic rocks ==
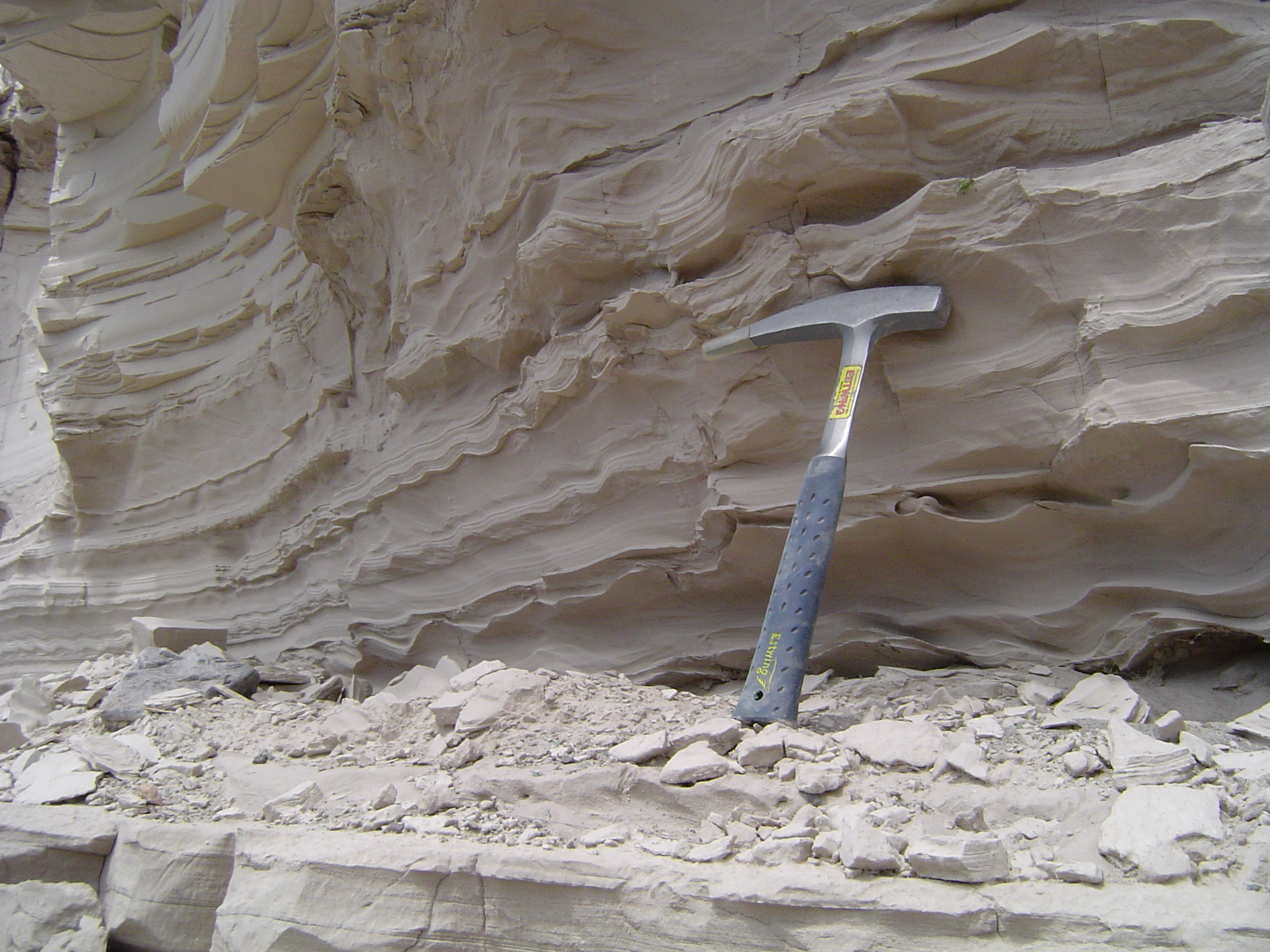
Claystone from Montana

Clastic sedimentary rocks are rocks composed predominantly of broken pieces or clasts of older weathered and eroded rocks. Clastic sediments or sedimentary rocks are classified based on grain size, clast and cementing material (matrix) composition, and texture. The classification factors are often useful in determining a sample's environment of deposition. An example of clastic environment would be a river system in which the full range of grains being transported by the moving water consist of pieces eroded from solid rock upstream.

Grain size varies from clay in shales and claystones; through silt in siltstones; sand in sandstones; and gravel, cobble, to boulder sized fragments in conglomerates and breccias. The Krumbein phi (φ) scale numerically orders these terms in a logarithmic size scale.

=== Siliciclastic sedimentary rocks ===
Siliciclastic rocks are clastic noncarbonate rocks that are composed almost exclusively of silicon, either as forms of quartz or as silicates.

==== Composition ====
The composition of siliciclastic sedimentary rocks includes the chemical and mineralogical components of the framework as well as the cementing material that make up these rocks. Boggs divides them into four categories; major minerals, accessory minerals, rock fragments, and chemical sediments.

Major minerals can be categorized into subdivisions based on their resistance to chemical decomposition. Those that possess a great resistance to decomposition are categorized as stable, while those that do not are considered less stable. The most common stable mineral in siliciclastic sedimentary rocks is quartz (SiO_{2}). Quartz makes up approximately 65 percent of framework grains present in sandstones and about 30 percent of minerals in the average shale. Less stable minerals present in this type of rocks are feldspars, including both potassium and plagioclase feldspars. Feldspars comprise a considerably lesser portion of framework grains and minerals. They only make up about 15 percent of framework grains in sandstones and 5% of minerals in shales. Clay mineral groups are mostly present in mudrocks (comprising more than 60% of the minerals) but can be found in other siliciclastic sedimentary rocks at considerably lower levels.

Accessory minerals are associated with those whose presence in the rock are not directly important to the classification of the specimen. These generally occur in smaller amounts in comparison to the quartz, and feldspars. Furthermore, those that do occur are generally heavy minerals or coarse grained micas (both muscovite and biotite).

Rock fragments also occur in the composition of siliciclastic sedimentary rocks and are responsible for about 10–15 percent of the composition of sandstone. They generally make up most of the gravel size particles in conglomerates but contribute only a very small amount to the composition of mudrocks. Though they sometimes are, rock fragments are not always sedimentary in origin. They can also be metamorphic or igneous.

Chemical cements vary in abundance but are predominantly found in sandstones. The two major types are silicate based and carbonate based. The majority of silica cements are composed of quartz, but can include chert, opal, feldspars and zeolites.

Composition includes the chemical and mineralogic make-up of the single or varied fragments and the cementing material (matrix) holding the clasts together as a rock. These differences are most commonly used in the framework grains of sandstones. Sandstones rich in quartz are called quartz arenites, those rich in feldspar are called arkoses, and those rich in lithics are called lithic sandstones.

==== Classification ====
Siliciclastic sedimentary rocks are composed of mainly silicate particles derived from the weathering of older rocks and pyroclastic volcanism. While grain size, clast and cementing material (matrix) composition, and texture are important factors when regarding composition, siliciclastic sedimentary rocks are classified according to grain size into three major categories: conglomerates, sandstones, and mudrocks. The term clay is used to classify particles smaller than .0039 millimeters. However, the term can also be used to refer to a family of sheet silicate minerals. Silt refers to particles that have a diameter between .062 and .0039 millimeters. The term mud is used when clay and silt particles are mixed in the sediment; mudrock is the name of the rock created with these sediments. Furthermore, particles that reach diameters between .062 and 2 millimeters fall into the category of sand. When sand is cemented together and lithified it becomes known as sandstone. Any particle that is larger than two millimeters is considered gravel. This category includes pebbles, cobbles and boulders. Like sandstone, when gravels are lithified they are considered conglomerates.

===== Conglomerates and breccias =====
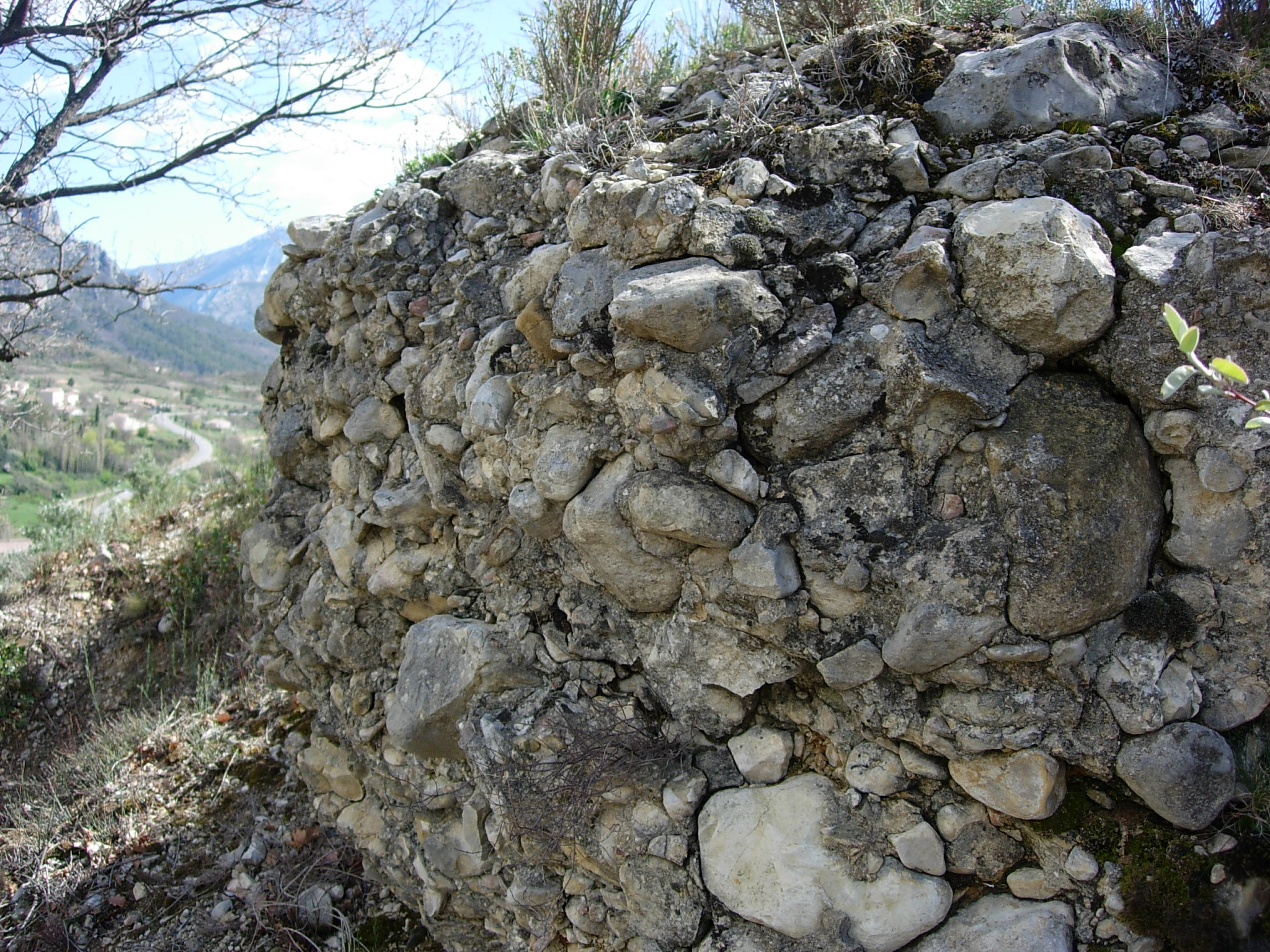
Conglomerate

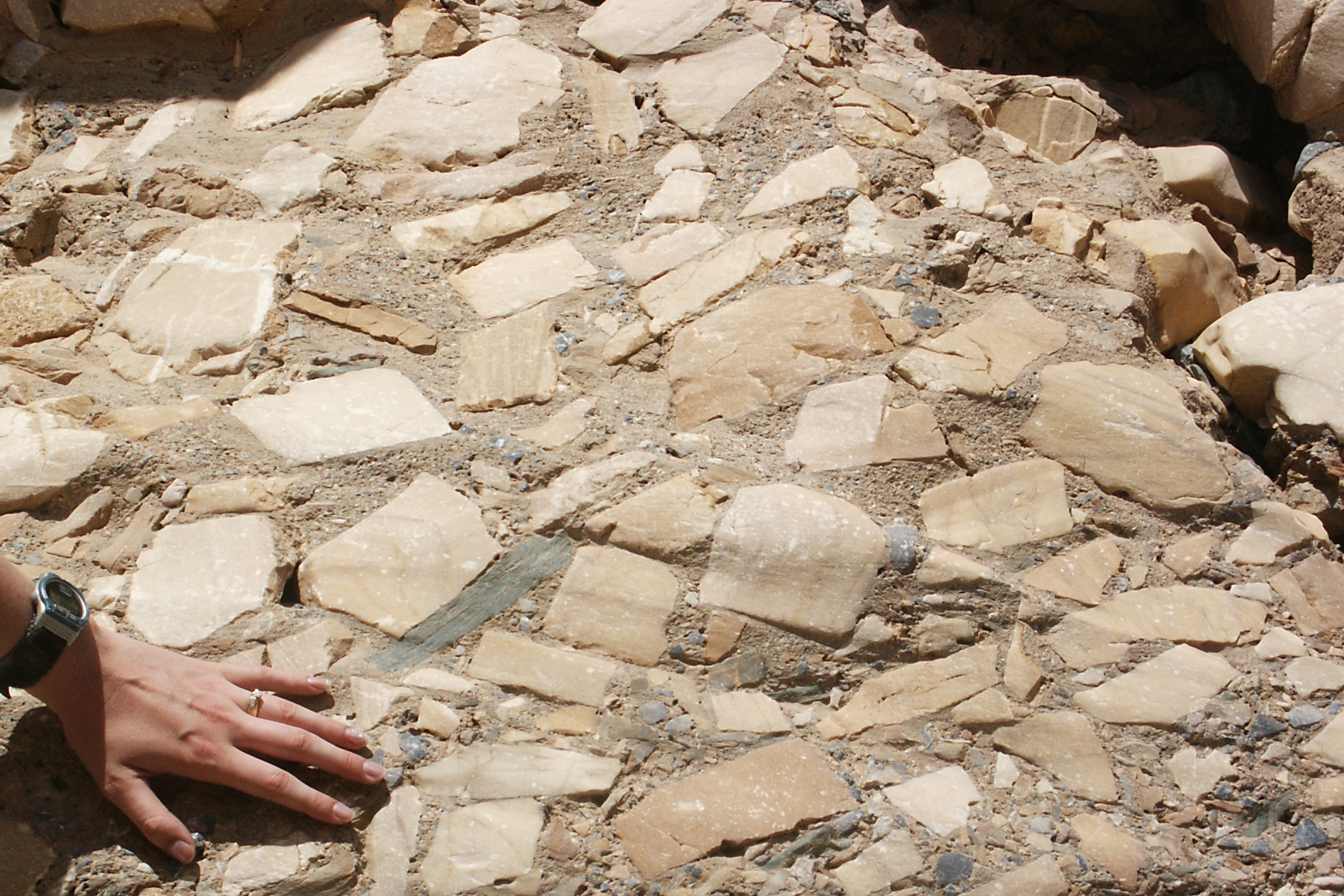
Breccia. Notice the angular nature of the large clasts

Conglomerates are coarse grained rocks dominantly composed of gravel sized particles that are typically held together by a finer grained matrix. These rocks are often subdivided into conglomerates and breccias. The major characteristic that divides these two categories is the amount of rounding. The gravel sized particles that make up conglomerates are well rounded while in breccias they are angular. Conglomerates are common in stratigraphic successions of most, if not all, ages but only make up one percent or less, by weight, of the total sedimentary rock mass. In terms of origin and depositional mechanisms they are very similar to sandstones. As a result, the two categories often contain the same sedimentary structures.

===== Sandstones =====
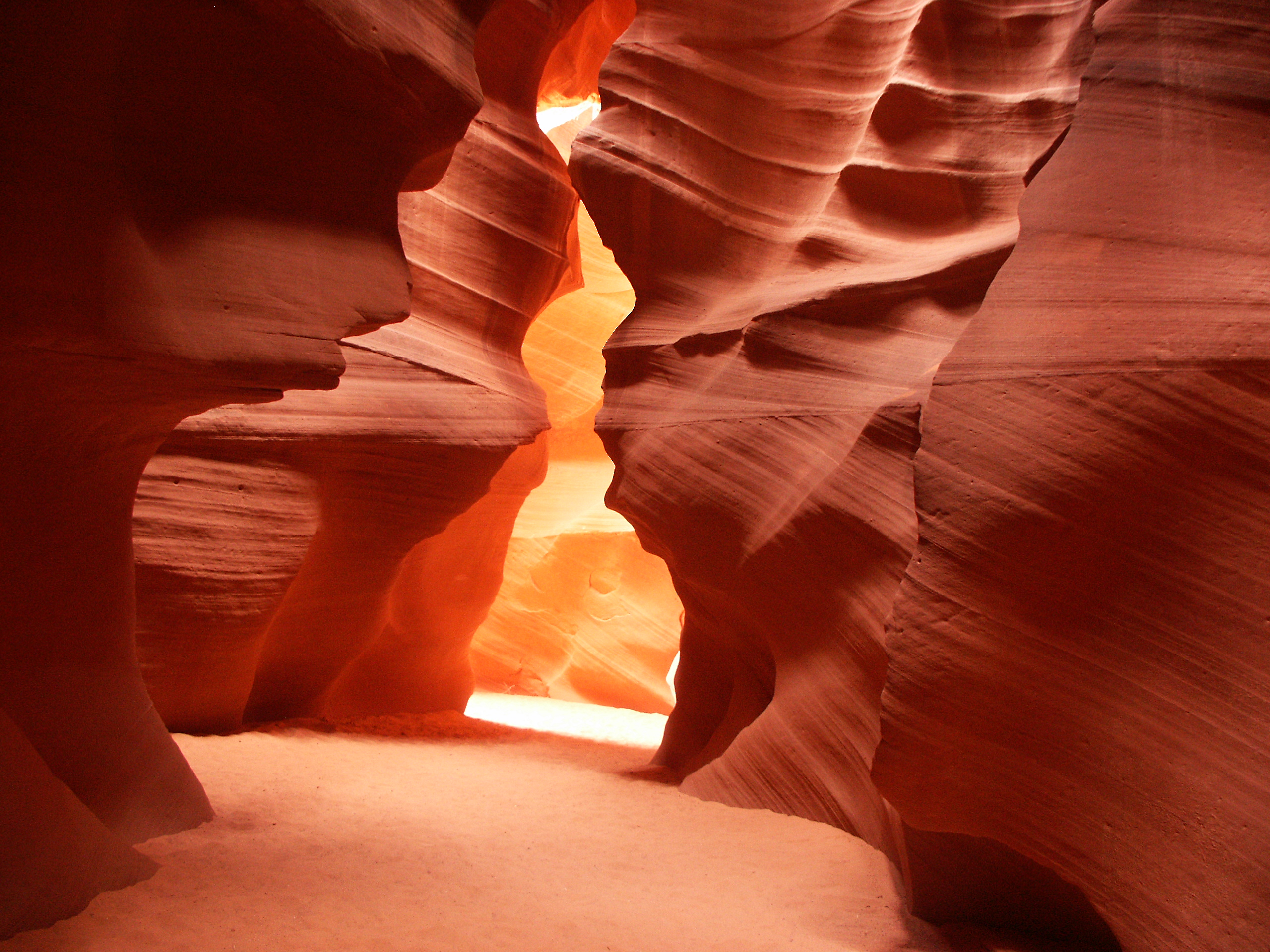
Sandstone from Lower Antelope Canyon

Sandstones are medium-grained rocks composed of rounded or angular fragments of sand size, that often but not always have a cement uniting them together. These sand-size particles are often quartz but there are a few common categories and a wide variety of classification schemes that classify sandstones based on composition. Classification schemes vary widely, but most geologists have adopted the Dott scheme, which uses the relative abundance of quartz, feldspar, and lithic framework grains and the abundance of muddy matrix between these larger grains.

===== Mudrocks =====
Rocks that are classified as mudrocks are very fine grained. Silt and clay represent at least 50% of the material that mudrocks are composed of. Classification schemes for mudrocks tend to vary, but most are based on the grain size of the major constituents. In mudrocks, these are generally silt, and clay.

According to Blatt, Middleton and Murray mudrocks that are composed mainly of silt particles are classified as siltstones. In turn, rocks that possess clay as the majority particle are called claystones. In geology, a mixture of both silt and clay is called mud. Rocks that possess large amounts of both clay and silt are called mudstones. In some cases the term shale is also used to refer to mudrocks and is still widely accepted by most. However, others have used the term shale to further divide mudrocks based on the percentage of clay constituents. The plate-like shape of clay allows its particles to stack up one on top of another, creating laminae or beds. The more clay present in a given specimen, the more laminated a rock is. Shale, in this case, is reserved for mudrocks that are laminated, while mudstone refers those that are not.

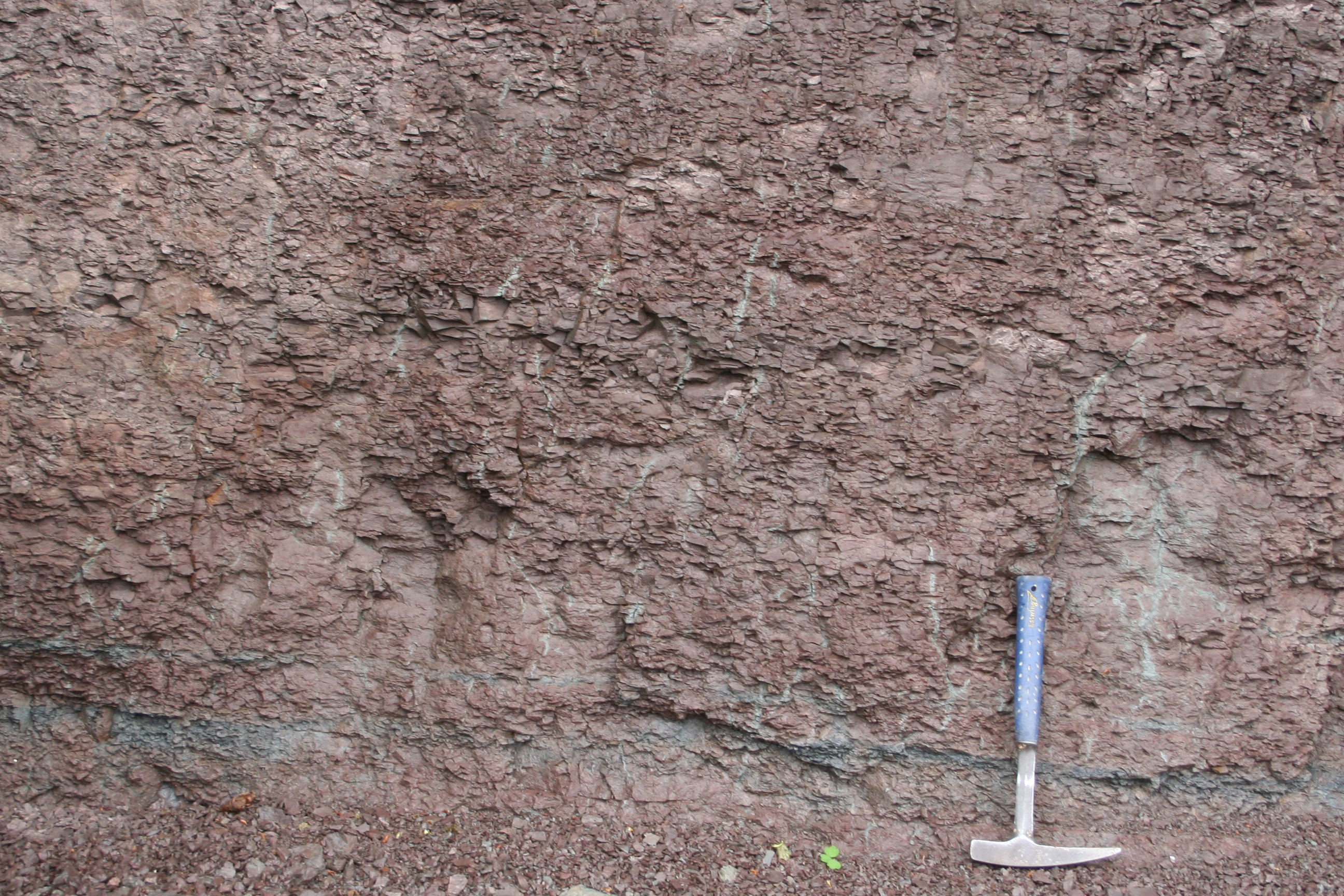
Red mudrock

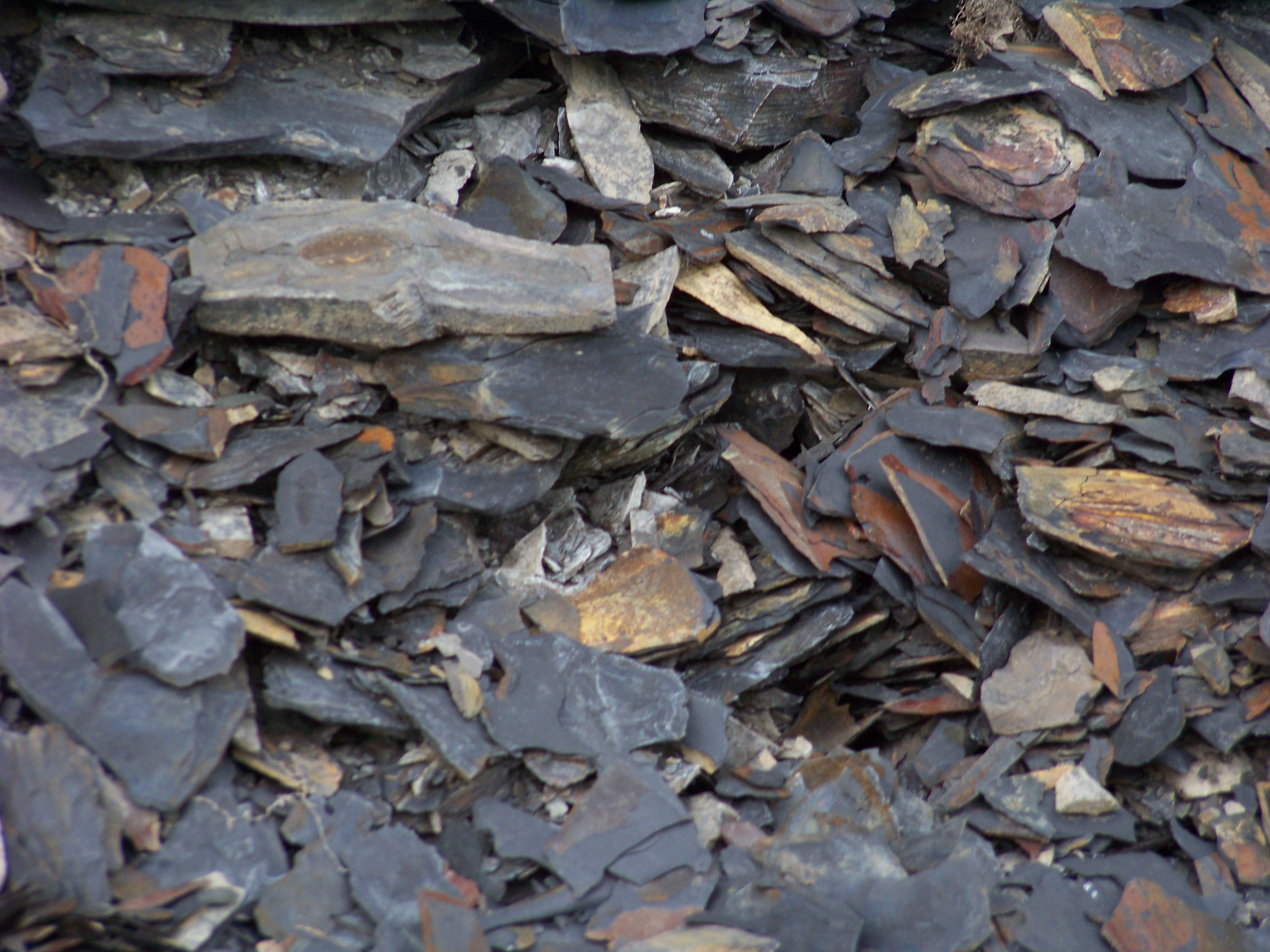
Black Shale

=== Diagenesis of siliciclastic sedimentary rocks ===
Siliciclastic rocks initially form as loosely packed sediment deposits including gravels, sands, and muds. The process of turning loose sediment into hard sedimentary rocks is called lithification. During the process of lithification, sediments undergo physical, chemical and mineralogical changes before becoming rock. The primary physical process in lithification is compaction. As sediment transport and deposition continues, new sediments are deposited atop previously deposited beds, burying them. Burial continues and the weight of overlying sediments causes an increase in temperature and pressure. This increase in temperature and pressure causes loose grained sediments become tightly packed, reducing porosity, essentially squeezing water out of the sediment. Porosity is further reduced by the precipitation of minerals into the remaining pore spaces. The final stage in the process is diagenesis and will be discussed in detail below.

==== Cementation ====
Cementation is the diagenetic process by which coarse clastic sediments become lithified or consolidated into hard, compact rocks, usually through the deposition or precipitation of minerals in the spaces between the individual grains of sediment. Cementation can occur simultaneously with deposition or at another time. Furthermore, once a sediment is deposited, it becomes subject to cementation through the various stages of diagenesis discussed below.

==== Shallow burial (eogenesis) ====
Eogenesis refers to the early stages of diagenesis. This can take place at very shallow depths, ranging from a few meters to tens of meters below the surface. The changes that occur during this diagenetic phase mainly relate to the reworking of the sediments. Compaction and grain repacking, bioturbation, as well as mineralogical changes all occur at varying degrees. Due to the shallow depths, sediments undergo only minor compaction and grain rearrangement during this stage. Organisms rework sediment near the depositional interface by burrowing, crawling, and in some cases sediment ingestion. This process can destroy sedimentary structures that were present upon deposition of the sediment. Structures such as lamination will give way to new structures associated with the activity of organisms. Despite being close to the surface, eogenesis does provide conditions for important mineralogical changes to occur. This mainly involves the precipitation of new minerals.

===== Mineralogical changes during eogenesis =====
Mineralogical changes that occur during eogenesis are dependent on the environment in which that sediment has been deposited. For example, the formation of pyrite is characteristic of reducing conditions in marine environments. Pyrite can form as cement, or replace organic materials, such as wood fragments. Other important reactions include the formation of chlorite, glauconite, illite and iron oxide (if oxygenated pore water is present). The precipitation of potassium feldspar, quartz overgrowths, and carbonate cements also occurs under marine conditions. In non marine environments oxidizing conditions are almost always prevalent, meaning iron oxides are commonly produced along with kaolin group clay minerals. The precipitation of quartz and calcite cements may also occur in non marine conditions.

==== Deep burial (mesogenesis) ====
===== Compaction =====
As sediments are buried deeper, load pressures become greater resulting in tight grain packing and bed thinning. This causes increased pressure between grains thus increasing the solubility of grains. As a result, the partial dissolution of silicate grains occurs. This is called pressure solutions. Chemically speaking, increases in temperature can also cause chemical reaction rates to increase. This increases the solubility of most common minerals (aside from evaporites). Furthermore, beds thin and porosity decreases allowing cementation to occur by the precipitation of silica or carbonate cements into remaining pore space.

In this process minerals crystallize from watery solutions that percolate through the pores between grain of sediment. The cement that is produced may or may not have the same chemical composition as the sediment. In sandstones, framework grains are often cemented by silica or carbonate. The extent of cementation is dependent on the composition of the sediment. For example, in lithic sandstones, cementation is less extensive because pore space between framework grains is filled with a muddy matrix that leaves little space for precipitation to occur. This is often the case for mudrocks as well. As a result of compaction, the clayey sediments comprising mudrocks are relatively impermeable.

===== Dissolution =====
Dissolution of framework silicate grains and previously formed carbonate cement may occur during deep burial. Conditions that encourage this are essentially opposite of those required for cementation. Rock fragments and silicate minerals of low stability, such as plagioclase feldspar, pyroxenes, and amphiboles, may dissolve as a result of increasing burial temperatures and the presence of organic acids in pore waters. The dissolution of frame work grains and cements increases porosity particularly in sandstones.

===== Mineral replacement =====
This refers to the process whereby one mineral is dissolved and a new mineral fills the space via precipitation. Replacement can be partial or complete. Complete replacement destroys the identity of the original minerals or rock fragments giving a biased view of the original mineralogy of the rock. Porosity can also be affected by this process. For example, clay minerals tend to fill up pore space and thereby reducing porosity.

==== Telogenesis ====
In the process of burial, it is possible that siliciclastic deposits may subsequently be uplifted as a result of a mountain building event or erosion. When uplift occurs, it exposes buried deposits to a radically new environment. Because the process brings material to or closer to the surface, sediments that undergo uplift are subjected to lower temperatures and pressures as well as slightly acidic rain water. Under these conditions, framework grains and cement are again subjected to dissolution and in turn increasing porosity. On the other hand, telogenesis can also change framework grains to clays, thus reducing porosity. These changes are dependent on the specific conditions that the rock is exposed as well as the composition of the rock and pore waters. Specific pore waters, can cause the further precipitation of carbonate or silica cements. This process can also encourage the process of oxidation on a variety of iron bearing minerals.

=== Sedimentary breccias ===
Sedimentary breccias are a type of clastic sedimentary rock which are composed of angular to subangular, randomly oriented clasts of other sedimentary rocks. They may form either:

1. In submarine debris flows, avalanches, mud flow or mass flow in an aqueous medium. Technically, turbidites are a form of debris flow deposit and are a fine-grained peripheral deposit to a sedimentary breccia flow.
2. As angular, poorly sorted, very immature fragments of rocks in a finer grained groundmass which are produced by mass wasting. These are, in essence, lithified colluvium. Thick sequences of sedimentary (colluvial) breccias are generally formed next to fault scarps in grabens.

In the field, it may at times be difficult to distinguish between a debris flow sedimentary breccia and a colluvial breccia, especially if one is working entirely from drilling information. Sedimentary breccias are an integral host rock for many sedimentary exhalative deposits.

== Igneous clastic rocks ==
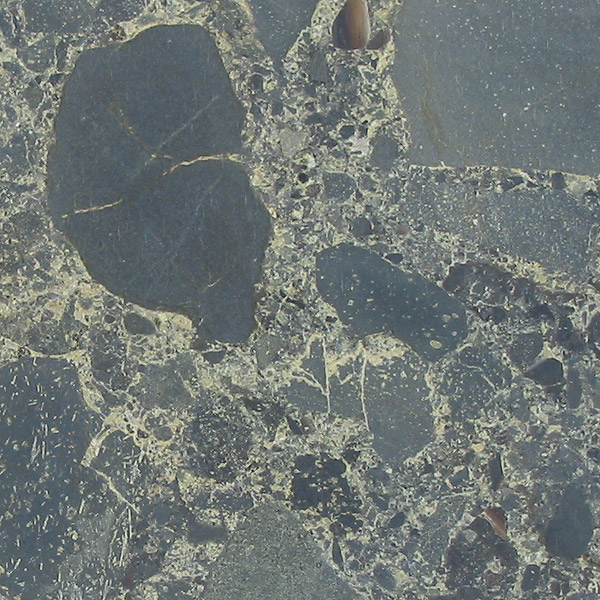
Basalt breccia, green groundmass is composed of epidote

Clastic igneous rocks include pyroclastic volcanic rocks such as tuff, agglomerate and intrusive breccias, as well as some marginal eutaxitic and taxitic intrusive morphologies. Igneous clastic rocks are broken by flow, injection or explosive disruption of solid or semi-solid igneous rocks or lavas.

Igneous clastic rocks can be divided into two classes:

1. Broken, fragmental rocks produced by intrusive processes, usually associated with plutons or porphyry stocks
2. Broken, fragmental rocks associated with volcanic eruptions, both of lava and pyroclastic type

== Metamorphic clastic rocks ==
Clastic metamorphic rocks include breccias formed in faults, as well as some protomylonite and pseudotachylite. Occasionally, metamorphic rocks can be brecciated via hydrothermal fluids, forming a hydrofracture breccia.

== Hydrothermal clastic rocks ==
Hydrothermal clastic rocks are generally restricted to those formed by hydrofracture, the process by which hydrothermal circulation cracks and brecciates the wall rocks and fills them in with veins. This is particularly prominent in epithermal ore deposits and is associated with alteration zones around many intrusive rocks, especially granites. Many skarn and greisen deposits are associated with hydrothermal breccias.

== Impact breccias ==
A fairly rare form of clastic rock may form during meteorite impact. This is composed primarily of ejecta; clasts of country rock, melted rock fragments, tektites (glass ejected from the impact crater) and exotic fragments, including fragments derived from the impactor itself.

Identifying a clastic rock as an impact breccia requires recognising shatter cones, tektites, spherulites, and the morphology of an impact crater, as well as potentially recognizing particular chemical and trace element signatures, especially osmiridium.

== See also ==
- Floater (geology)
