= Fiamme =

Small lens-shaped inclusions in volcaniclastic rocks

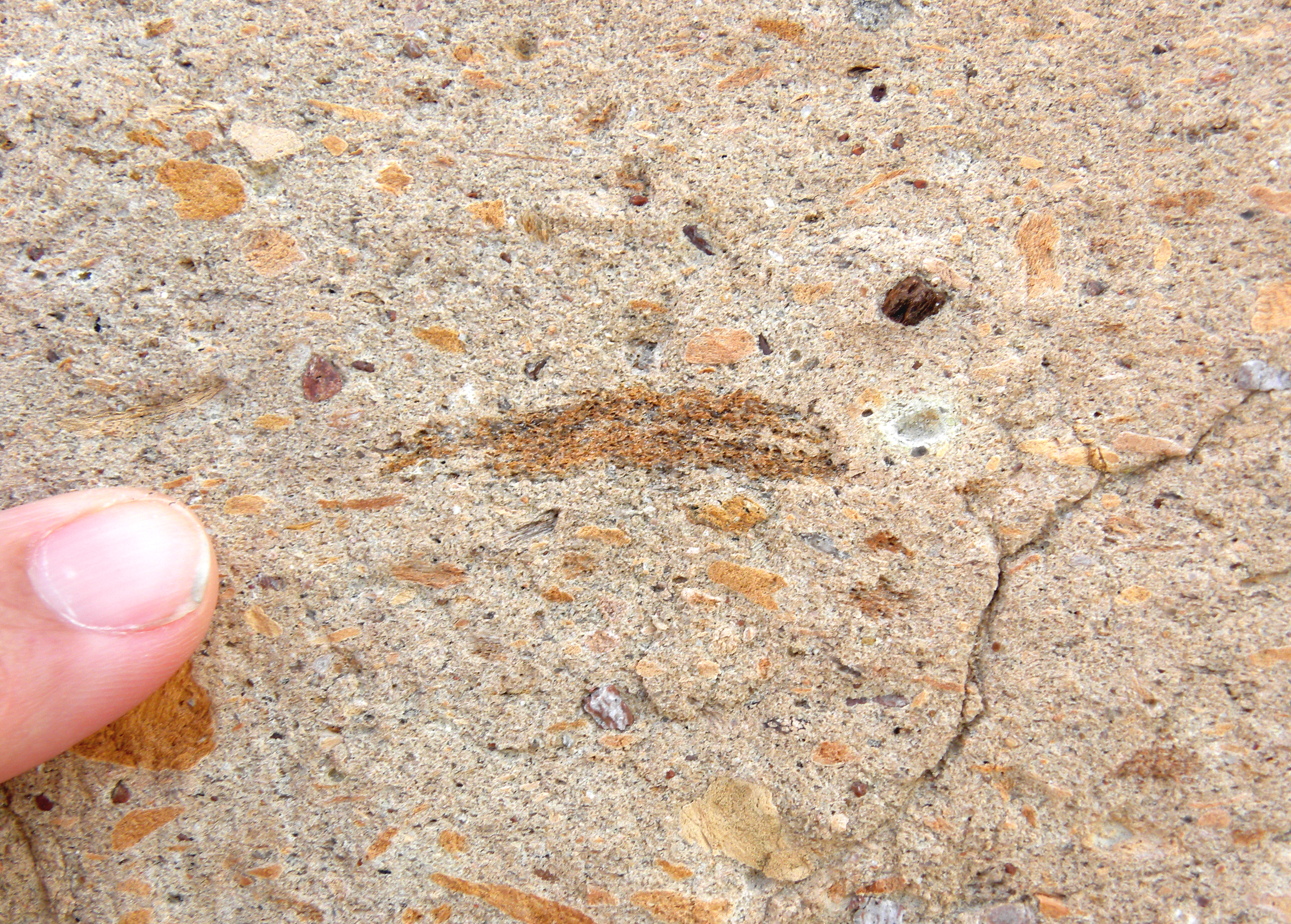
Fiamme in the Resting Spring Tuff near Shoshone, California.

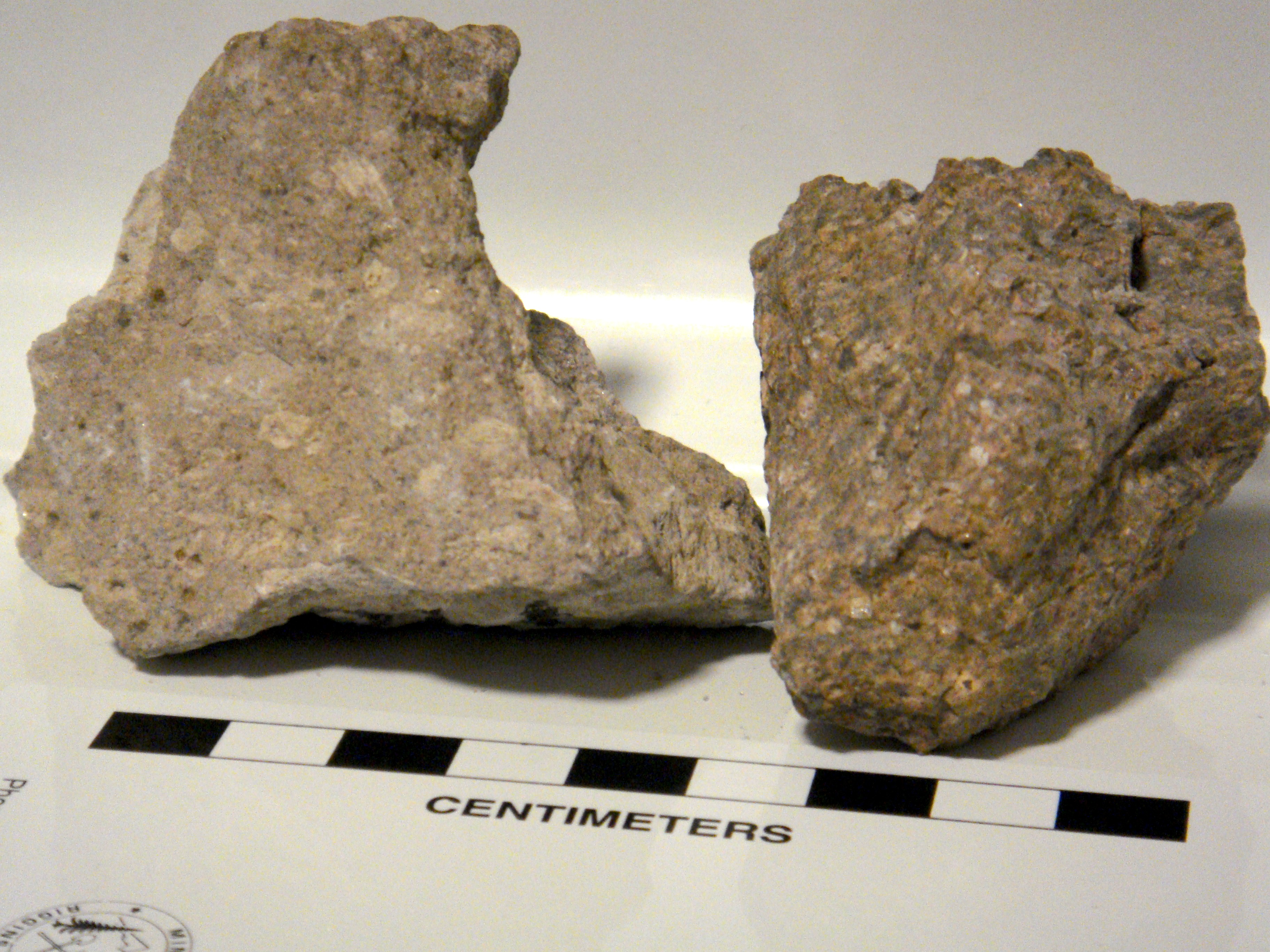
Rocks from the Bishop tuff, uncompressed with pumice on left; compressed with fiamme on right.

Fiamme are lens-shapes, usually millimetres to centimetres in size, seen on surfaces of some volcaniclastic rocks. They can occur in welded pyroclastic fall deposits and in ignimbrites, which are the deposits of pumiceous pyroclastic density currents. The name fiamme comes from the Italian word for flames, describing their shape. The term is descriptive and non-genetic.

Fiamme are most typical of welded lapilli-tuffs and are commonly found in association with eutaxitic textures, best seen under the microscope.

Some fiamme represent fragments of volcanic ejecta, often pumice lapilli that have been flattened by compaction and/or shear. Some fiamme are formed from flattened hot, relatively low viscosity, high porosity fragments of volcanic glass or pumice. But this is not the only way they can form: they can also form when pumice lapilli are altered to clay and compact during diagenesis; and fiamme are also widely reported in viscous lavas (andesites to rhyolites) where they form by shear-induced autobrecciation of pumiceous or obsidian zones, followed by shear and annealing of the fragments. Fiamme can also result from patchy alteration and recrystalisation of volcanic rocks, or by patchy revesiculation of welded tuff matrix (especially in rheomorphic peralkaline tuffs).

== See also ==
- Agglomerate – Coarse accumulation of volcanic material
- Ignimbrite – Type of volcanic rock
- Rock microstructure – Relationship between materials which compose a rock
