= Tuff =

Rock consolidated from volcanic ash

- Igneous rock
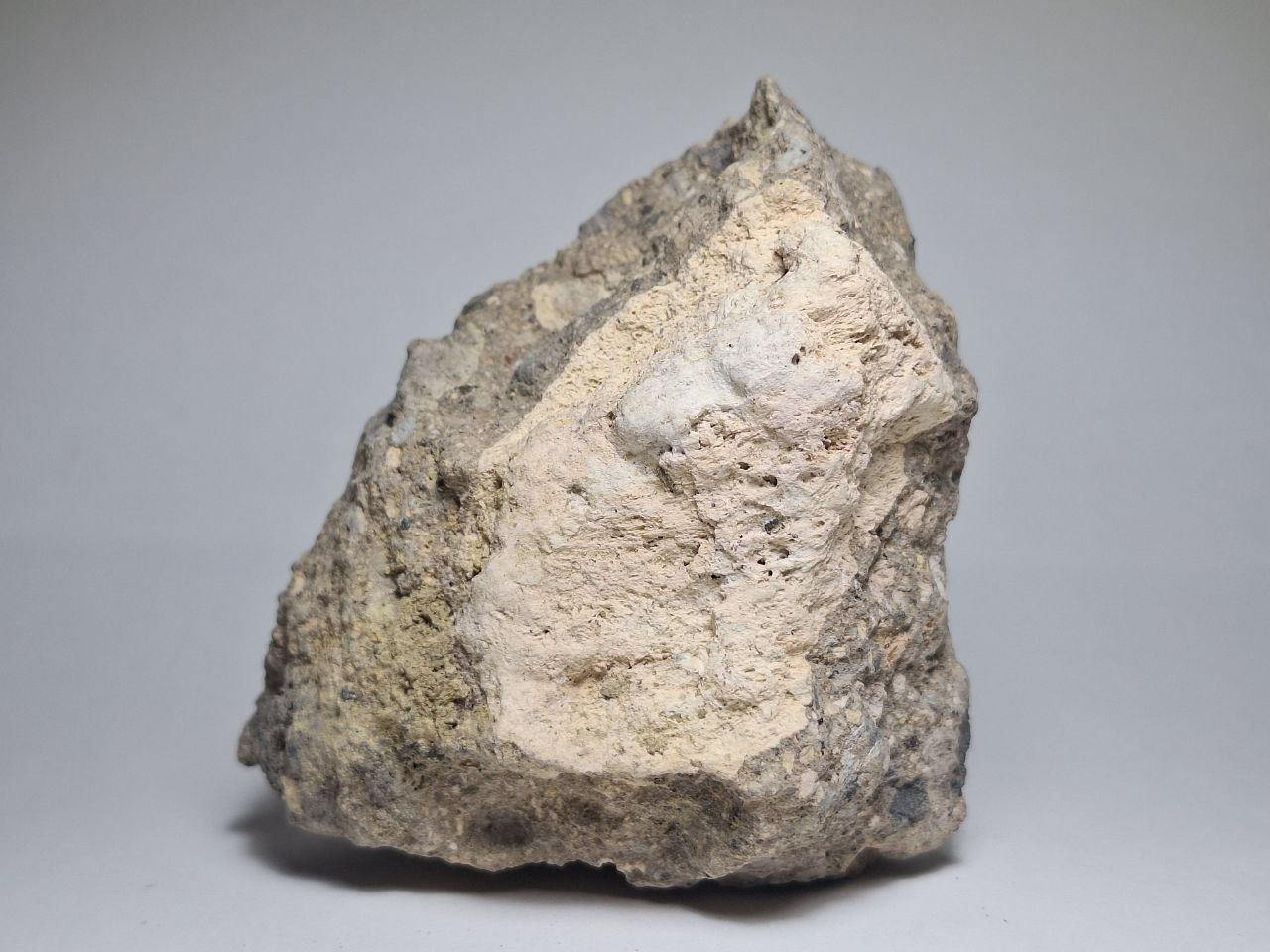
- Tuff from the Guadalupe Formation in Luzon, Philippines

Composition
- Classification: Mafic to felsic
- Primary: Volcanic ash
- Secondary: Quartz, feldspars (sanidine, anorthoclase, plagioclase), biotite, pyroxene (augite), hornblende, and magnetite
- Texture: Pyroclastic or eutaxitic

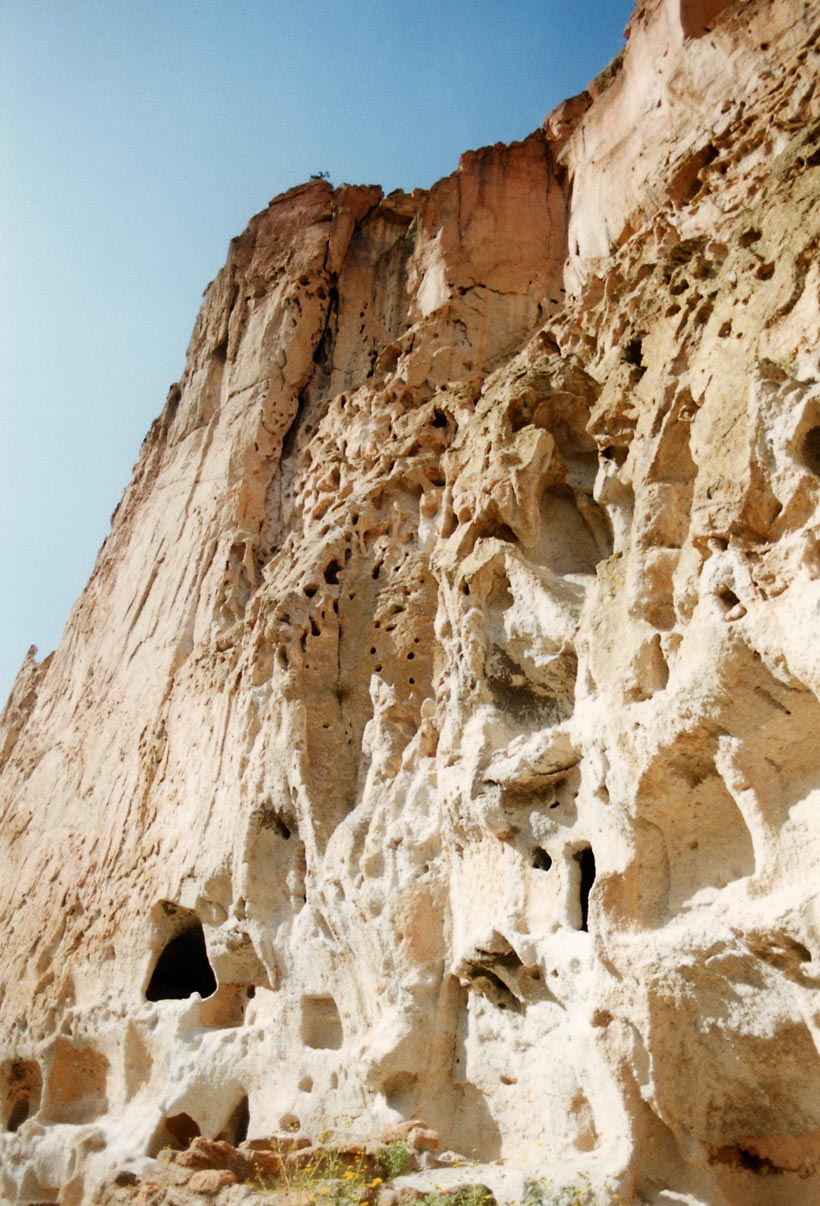
Cliff face of welded tuff pockmarked with holes—some natural, some man-made—from Bandelier National Monument, New Mexico

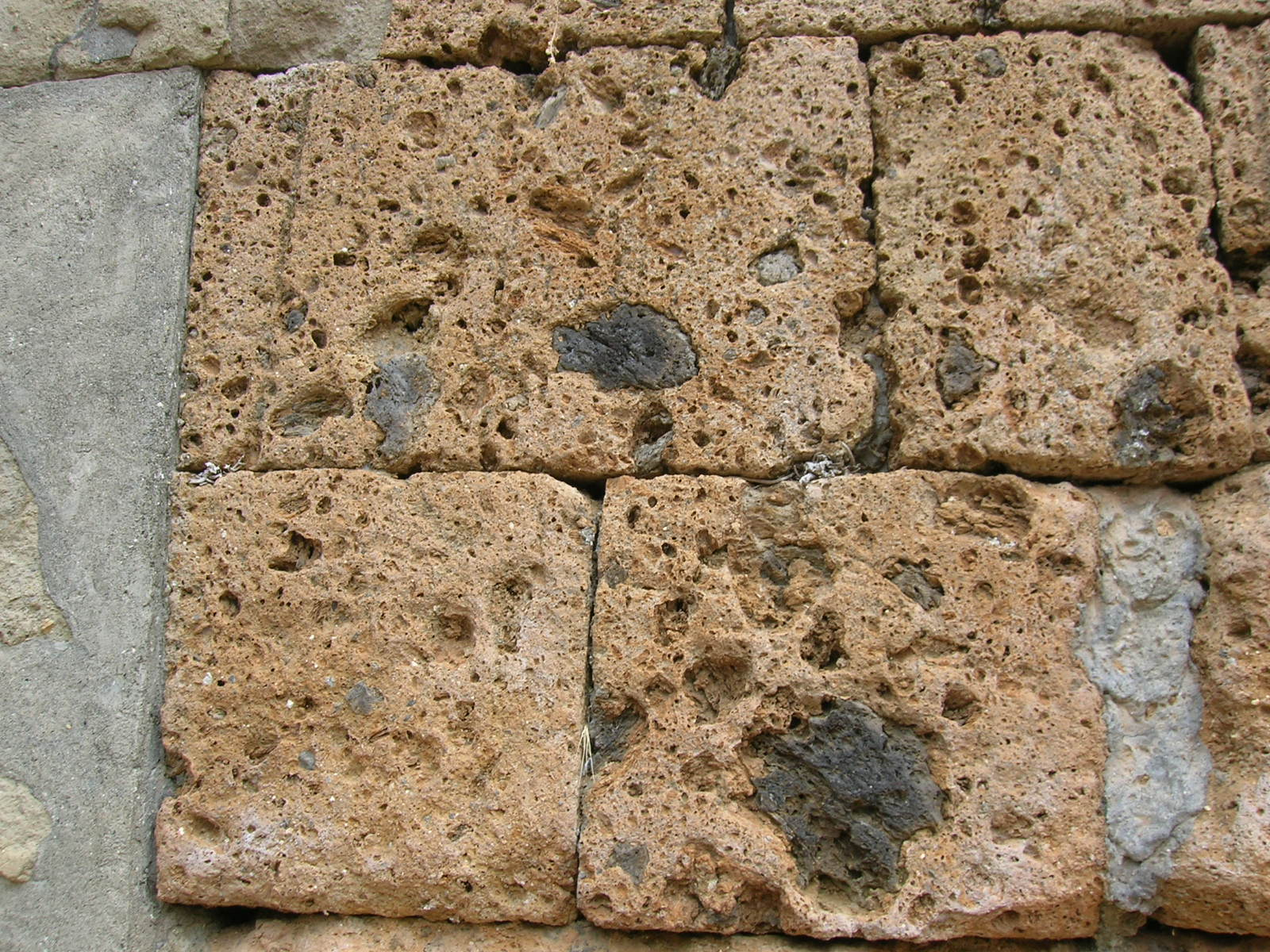
Etruscan tuff blocks from a tomb at Banditaccia, Italy

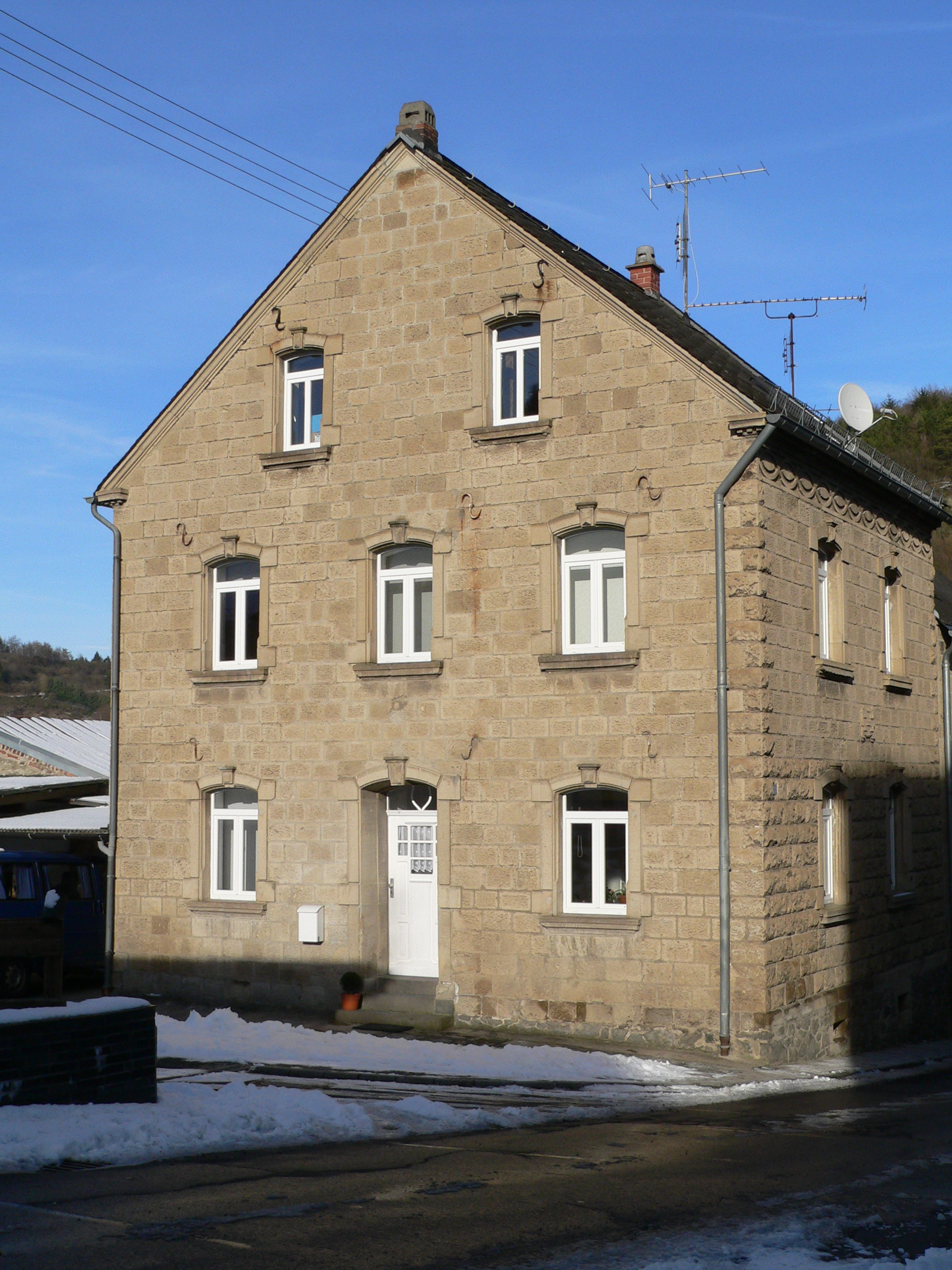
A house constructed of tuff blocks in Rieden, Rhineland-Palatinate, in the Volcanic Eifel region, Germany

Tuff is a type of rock made of volcanic ash ejected from a vent during a volcanic eruption. Following ejection and deposition, the ash lithifies into solid rock. Rock that contains greater than 75% ash is considered tuff, while rock containing 25–75% ash is described as tuffaceous (for example, tuffaceous sandstone). A pyroclastic rock containing 25–75% volcanic bombs or volcanic blocks is called tuff breccia. Tuff composed of sandy volcanic material can be referred to as volcanic sandstone.

Despite the name, tuff is a relatively soft rock, so it has been used for construction since ancient times. Because it is common in Italy, the Romans used it often for construction. The Rapa Nui people used it to make most of the moai statues on Easter Island.

Tuff can be classified as either igneous or sedimentary rock. It is usually studied in the context of igneous petrology, although it is sometimes described using sedimentological terms.

Tuff is often erroneously called tufa in guidebooks and in television programs, but tufa is a form of travertine.

== Volcanic ash ==
The material that is expelled in a volcanic eruption can be classified into three types:

1. Volcanic gases, a mixture made mostly of steam, carbon dioxide, and a sulfur compound (either sulfur dioxide, SO_{2}, or hydrogen sulfide, H_{2}S, depending on the temperature)
2. Lava, the name of magma when it emerges and flows over the surface
3. Tephra, particles of solid material of all shapes and sizes ejected and thrown through the air

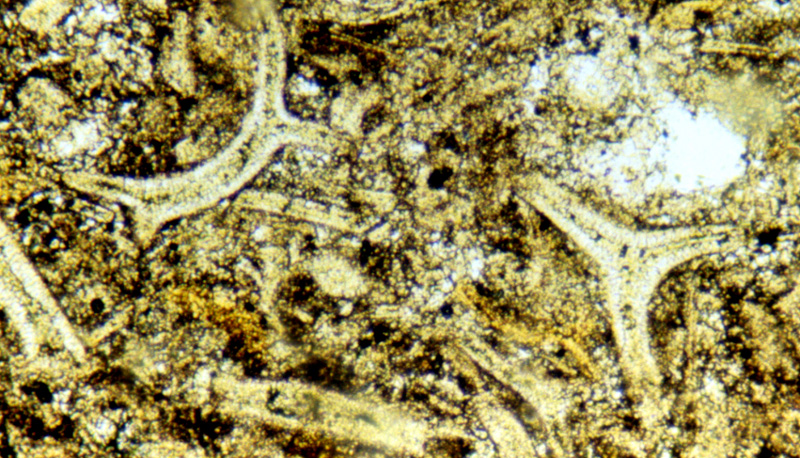
Light-microscope image of tuff as seen in thin section (long dimension is several mm): The curved shapes of altered glass shards (ash fragments) are well preserved, although the glass is partly altered. The shapes were formed about bubbles of expanding, water-rich gas.

Tephra is made when magma inside the volcano is blown apart by the rapid expansion of hot volcanic gases. Magma commonly explodes as the gas dissolved in it comes out of solution as the pressure decreases when it flows to the surface. These violent explosions produce particles of material that can then fly from the volcano. Solid particles smaller than 2 mm in diameter (sand-sized or smaller) are called volcanic ash.

Volcanic ash is further divided into fine ash, with particle sizes smaller than 0.0625 mm in diameter, and coarse ash, with particle sizes between 0.0625 mm and 2 mm in diameter. Tuff is correspondingly divided into coarse tuff (coarse ash tuff) and fine tuff (fine ash tuff or dust tuff). Consolidated tephra composed mostly of coarser particles is called lapillistone (particles 2 mm to 64 mm in diameter) or agglomerate or pyroclastic breccia (particles over 64 mm in diameter) rather than tuff.

Volcanic ash can vary greatly in composition, and so tuffs are further classified by the composition of the ash from which they formed. Ash from high-silica volcanism, particularly in ash flows, consists mainly of shards of volcanic glass, and tuff formed predominantly from glass shards is described as vitric tuff. The glass shards are typically either irregular in shape or are roughly triangular with convex sides. They are the shattered walls of countless small bubbles that formed in the magma as dissolved gases rapidly came out of solution.

Tuffs formed from ash consisting predominantly of individual crystals are described as crystal tuffs, while those formed from ash consisting predominantly of pulverized rock fragments are described as lithic tuffs.

The chemical composition of volcanic ash reflects the entire range of volcanic rock chemistry, from high-silica rhyolitic ash to low-silica basaltic ash, and tuffs are likewise described as rhyolitic, andesitic, basaltic, and so on.

== Transport and lithification ==
The most straightforward way for volcanic ash to move away from the vent is as ash clouds that are part of an eruption column. These fall to the surface as fallout deposits that are characteristically well-sorted and tend to form a blanket of uniform thickness across terrain. Column collapse results in a more spectacular and destructive form of transport, which takes the form of pyroclastic flows and surges that characteristically are poorly sorted and pool in low terrain. Surge deposits sometimes show sedimentary structures typical of high-velocity flow, such as dunes and antidunes. Volcanic ash already deposited on the surface can be transported as mud flows (lahars) when mingled with water from rainfall or through eruption into a body of water or ice.

Particles of volcanic ash that are sufficiently hot will weld together after settling to the surface, producing a welded tuff. Welding requires temperatures in excess of 600 °C (1,100 °F). If the rock contains scattered, pea-sized fragments or fiamme in it, it is called a welded lapilli tuff. Welded tuffs (and welded lapilli tuffs) can be of fallout origin, or deposited from ash flows, as in the case of ignimbrites. During welding, the glass shards and pumice fragments adhere together (necking at point contacts), deform, and compact together, resulting in a eutaxitic fabric. Welded tuff is commonly rhyolitic in composition, but examples of all compositions are known.

A sequence of ash flows may consist of multiple cooling units. These can be distinguished by the degree of welding. The base of a cooling unit is typically unwelded due to chilling from the underlying cold surface, and the degree of welding and of secondary reactions from fluids in the flow increases upwards towards the center of the flow. Welding decreases towards the top of the cooling unit, where the unit cools more rapidly. The intensity of welding may also decrease towards areas in which the deposit is thinner, and with distance from source.

Cooler pyroclastic flows are unwelded and the ash sheets deposited by them are relatively unconsolidated. However, cooled volcanic ash can quickly become lithified because it usually has a high content of volcanic glass. This is a thermodynamically unstable material that reacts rapidly with groundwater or seawater, which leaches alkali metals and calcium from the glass. New minerals, such as zeolites, clays, and calcite, crystallize from the dissolved substances and cement the tuff.

Tuffs are further classified by their depositional environment, such as lacustrine tuff, subaerial tuff, or submarine tuff, or by the mechanism by which the ash was transported, such as fallout tuff or ash flow tuff. Reworked tuffs, formed by erosion and redeposition of ash deposits, are usually described by the transport agent, such as aeolian tuff or fluvial tuff.

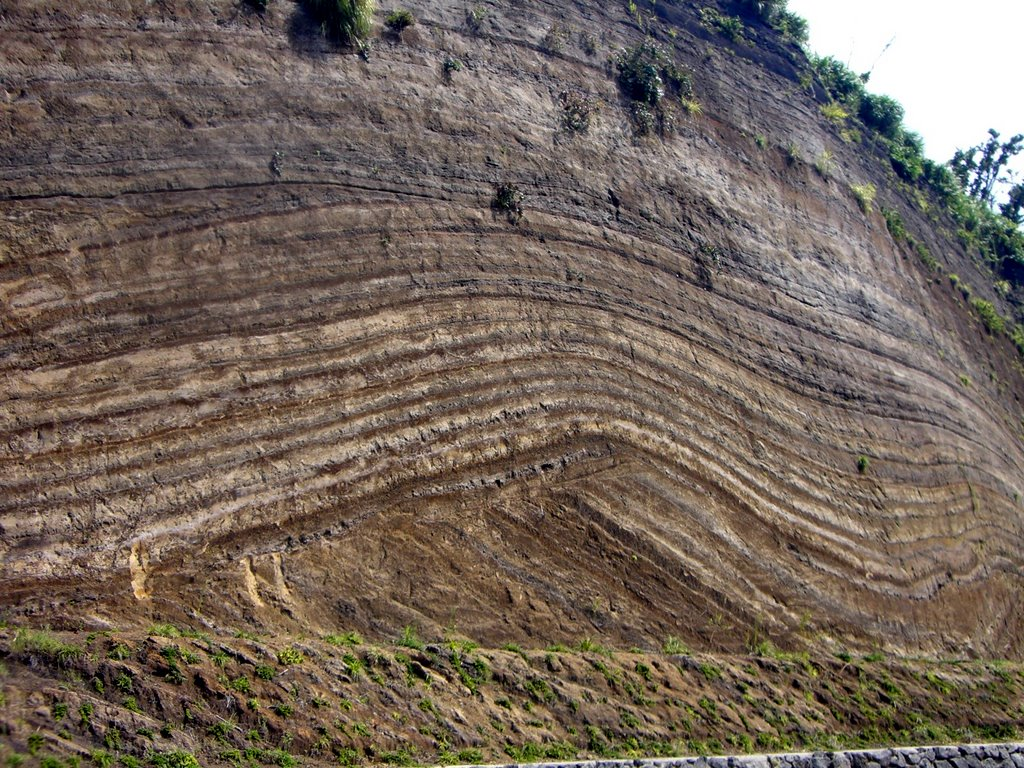
Layers of fallout tuff in Japan

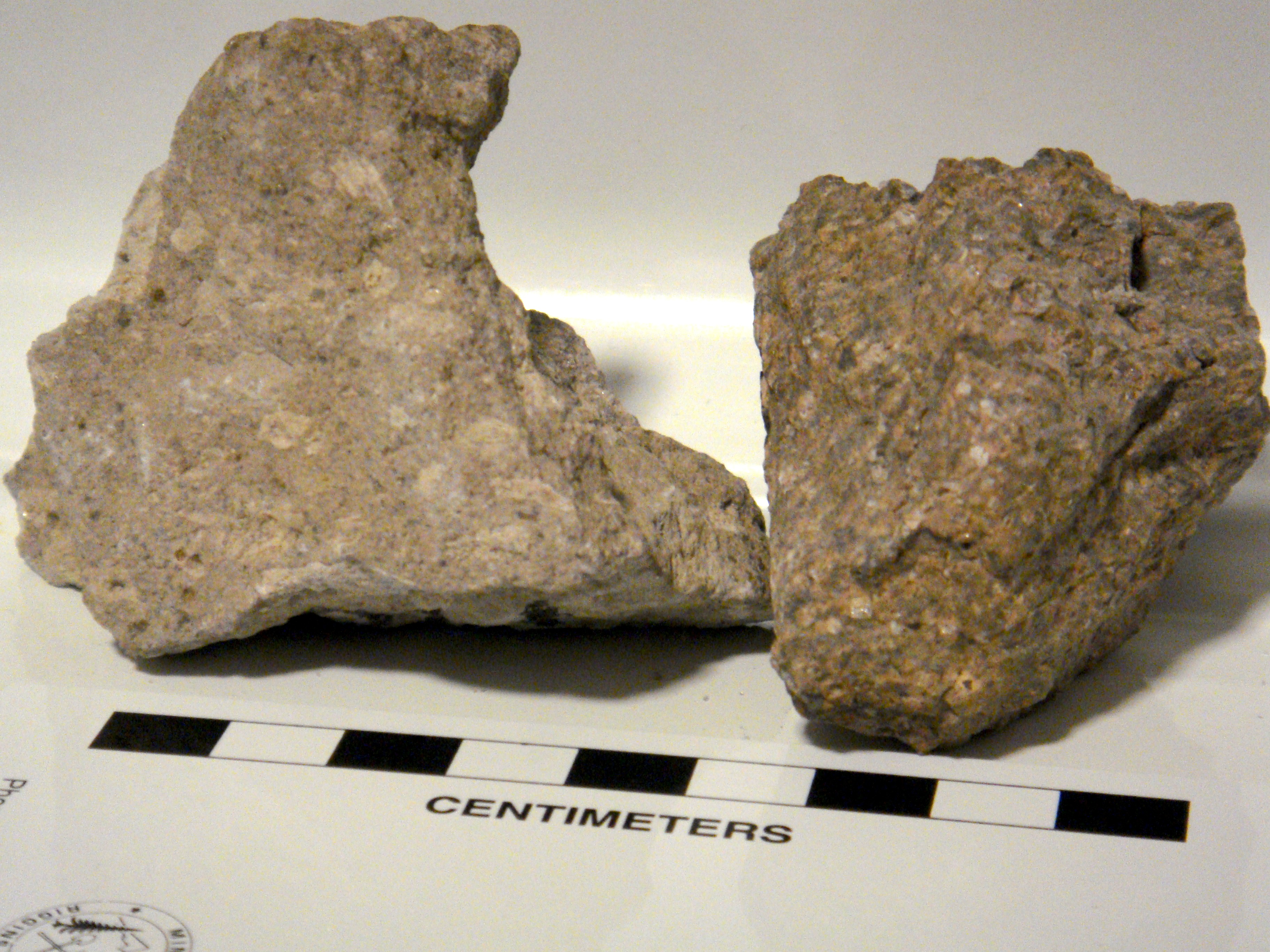
Rocks from the Bishop tuff in California: unwelded with pumice on left, welded with fiamme on right

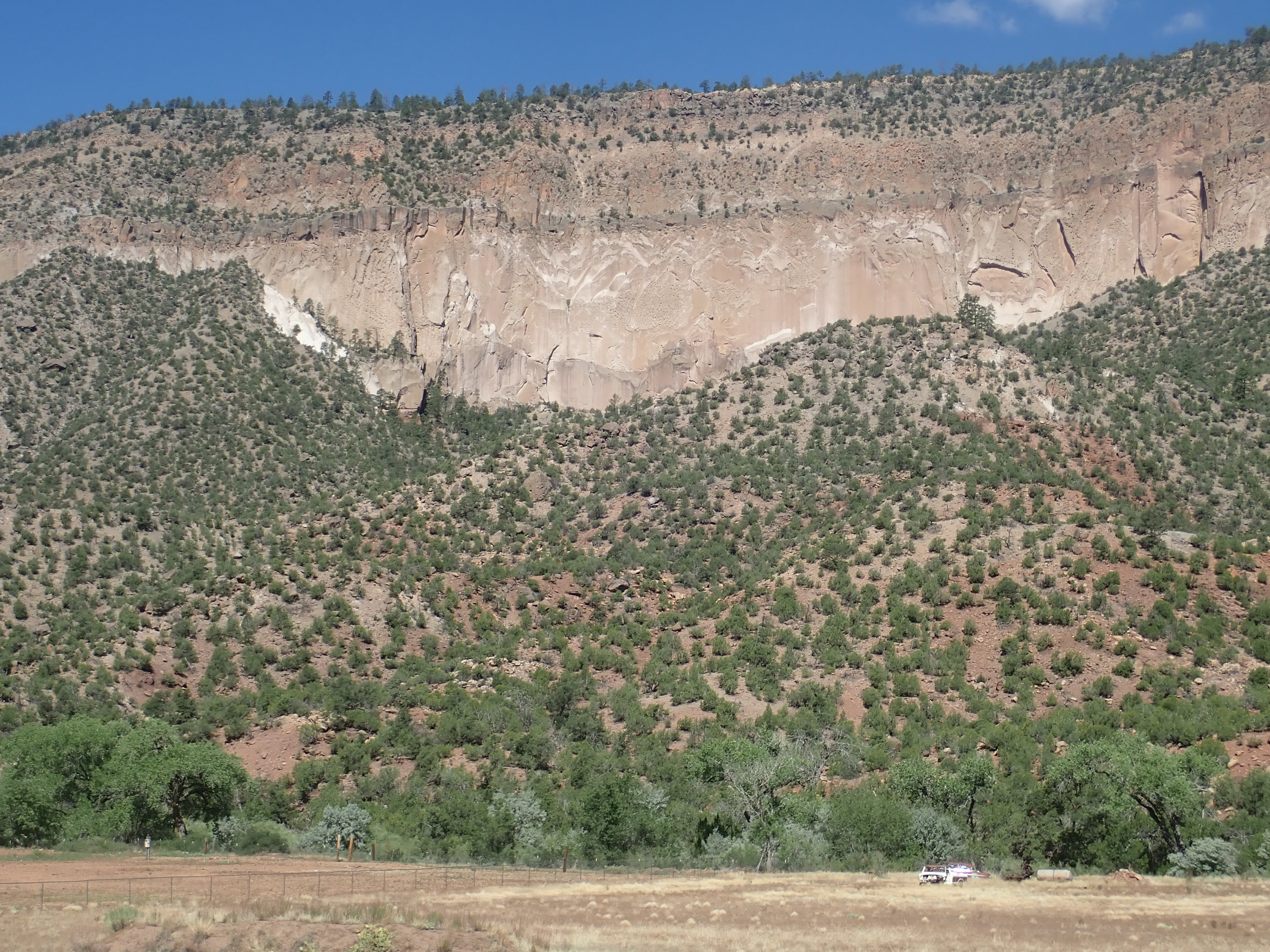
Bandelier Tuff at San Diego Canyon, New Mexico, U.S. The lower Otowi Member is a single massive cooling unit, while the upper Tshirege Member is composed of multiple cooling units.

== Occurrences ==
Tuffs have the potential to be deposited wherever explosive volcanism takes place, and so have a wide distribution in location and age.

=== High-silica volcanism ===
Rhyolite tuffs contain pumiceous, glassy fragments and small scoriae with quartz, alkali feldspar, biotite, etc. Iceland, Lipari, Hungary, the Basin and Range of the American southwest, and New Zealand are among the areas where such tuffs are prominent. In the ancient rocks of Wales, Charnwood, etc., similar tuffs are known, but in all cases, they are greatly changed by silicification (which has filled them with opal, chalcedony, and quartz) and by devitrification. The frequent presence of rounded corroded quartz crystals, such as occur in rhyolitic lavas, helps to demonstrate their real nature.

Welded ignimbrites can be highly voluminous, such as the Lava Creek Tuff erupted from Yellowstone Caldera in Wyoming 631,000 years ago. This tuff had an original volume of at least 1,000 cubic kilometers (240 cu mi). Lava Creek tuff is known to be at least 1,000 times as large as the deposits of the 1980 eruption of Mount St. Helens, and it had a Volcanic Explosivity Index (VEI) of 8, greater than any eruption known in the last 10,000 years. Ash flow tuffs cover 7,000 square kilometers (2,700 sq mi) of the North Island of New Zealand and about 100,000 square kilometers (39,000 sq mi) of Nevada. Ash flow tuffs are the only volcanic product with volumes rivaling those of flood basalts.

The Tioga Bentonite of the northeastern United States varies in composition from crystal tuff to tuffaceous shale. It was deposited as ash carried by wind that fell out over the sea and settled to the bottom. It is Devonian in age and likely came from a vent in central Virginia, where the tuff reaches its maximum thickness of about 40 meters (130 ft).

=== Alkaline volcanism ===
Trachyte tuffs contain little or no quartz, but much sanidine or anorthoclase and sometimes oligoclase feldspar, with occasional biotite, augite, and hornblende. In weathering, they often change to soft red or yellow claystones, rich in kaolin with secondary quartz. Recent trachyte tuffs are found on the Rhine (at Siebengebirge), in Ischia and near Naples. Trachyte-carbonatite tuffs have been identified in the East African Rift. Alkaline crystal tuffs have been reported from Rio de Janeiro.

=== Intermediate volcanism ===
Andesitic tuffs are exceedingly common. They occur along the whole chain of the Cordilleras and Andes, in the West Indies, New Zealand, Japan, etc. In the Lake District, North Wales, Lorne, the Pentland Hills, the Cheviots, and many other districts of Great Britain, ancient rocks of exactly similar nature are abundant. In color, they are red or brown; their scoriae fragments are of all sizes from huge blocks down to minute granular dust. The cavities are filled with many secondary minerals, such as calcite, chlorite, quartz, epidote, or chalcedony; in microscopic sections, though, the nature of the original lava can nearly always be made out from the shapes and properties of the little crystals which occur in the decomposed glassy base. Even in the smallest details, these ancient tuffs have a complete resemblance to the modern ash beds of Cotopaxi, Krakatoa, and Mont Pelé.

=== Mafic volcanism ===
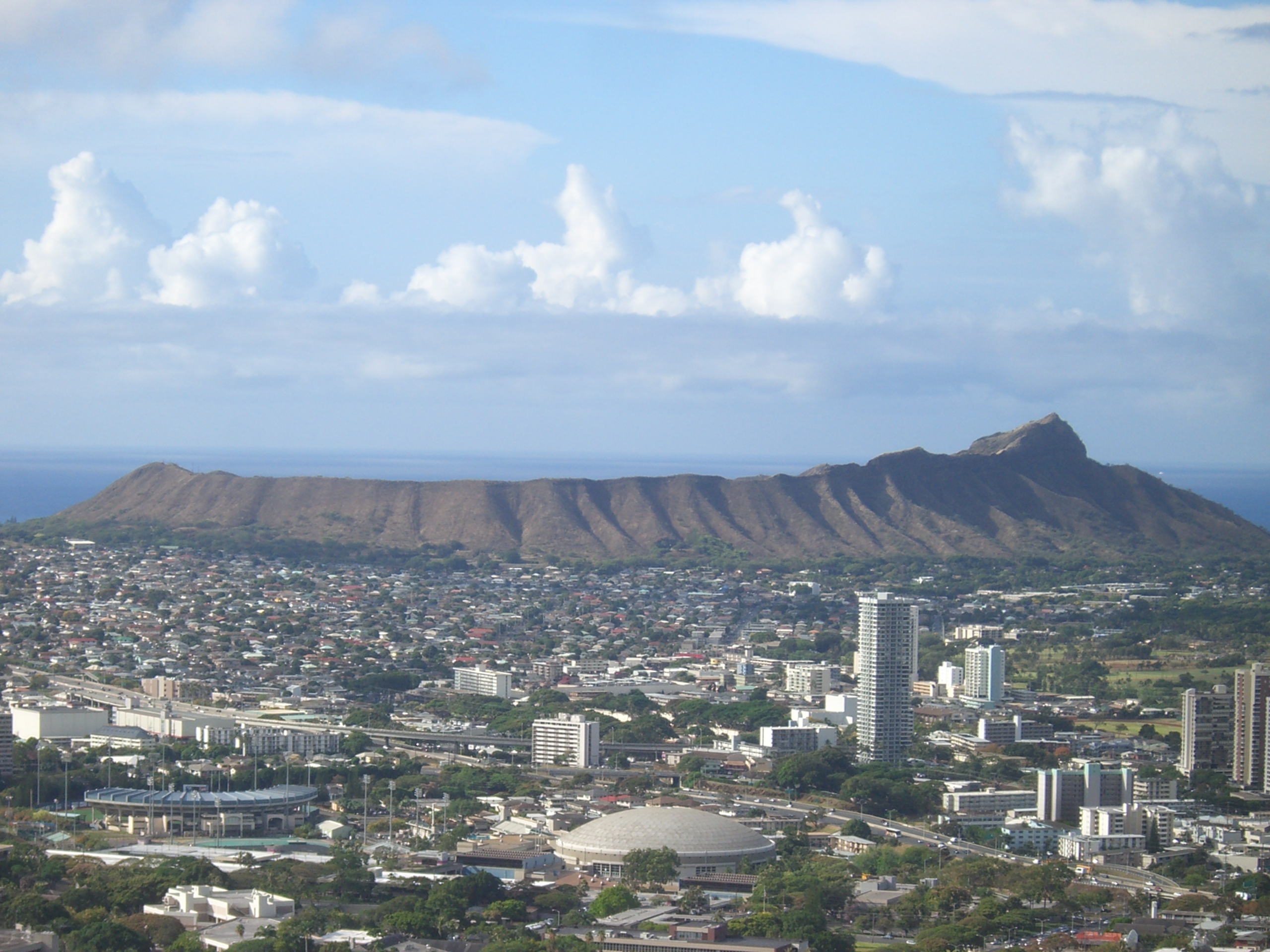
Diamond Head, a tuff cone

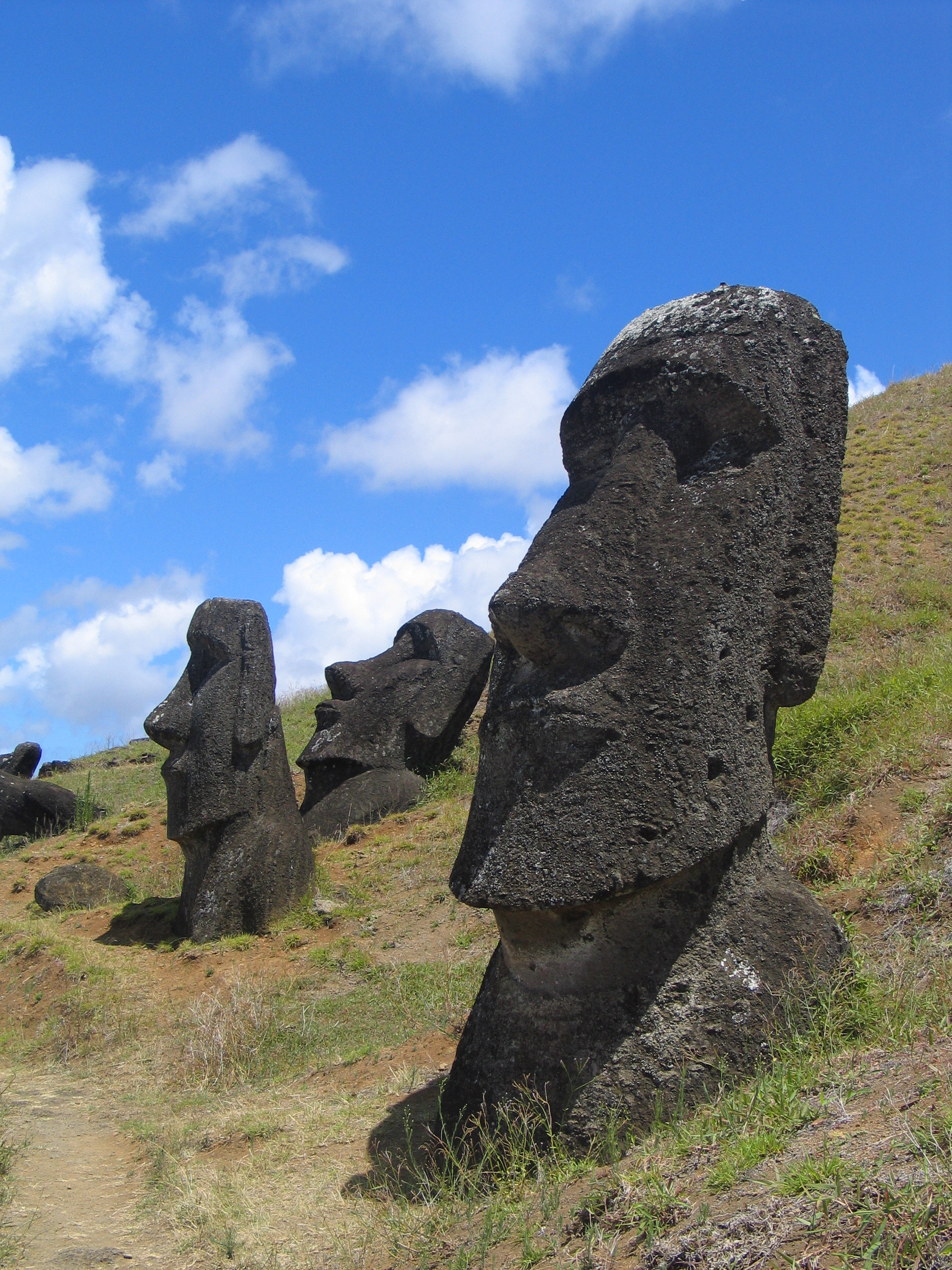
Most of the moais in Easter Island are carved out of tholeiite basalt tuff.

Mafic volcanism typically takes the form of Hawaiian eruptions that are nonexplosive and produce little ash. However, interaction between basaltic magma and groundwater or seawater results in hydromagmatic explosions that produce abundant ash. These deposit ash cones that subsequently can become cemented into tuff cones. Diamond Head, Hawaii, is an example of a tuff cone, as is the island of Kaʻula. The glassy basaltic ash produced in such eruptions rapidly alters to palagonite as part of the process of lithification.

Although conventional mafic volcanism produce little ash, such ash as is formed may accumulate locally as significant deposits. An example is the Pahala ash of Hawaii island, which locally is as thick as 15 meters (49 ft). These deposits also rapidly alter to palagonite, and eventually weather to laterite.

Basaltic tuffs are also found in County Antrim, Skye, Mull, and other places, where Paleogene volcanic rocks are found; in Scotland, Derbyshire, and Ireland among the Carboniferous strata, and among the still older rocks of the Lake District, the southern uplands of Scotland, and Wales. They are black, dark green, or red in colour; vary greatly in coarseness, some being full of round spongy bombs a foot or more in diameter; and being often submarine, may contain shale, sandstone, grit, and other sedimentary material, and are occasionally fossiliferous. Recent basaltic tuffs are found in Iceland, the Faroe Islands, Jan Mayen, Sicily, the Hawaiian Islands, Samoa, etc. When weathered, they are filled with calcite, chlorite, serpentine, and especially where the lavas contain nepheline or leucite, are often rich in zeolites, such as analcite, prehnite, natrolite, scolecite, chabazite, heulandite, etc.

=== Ultramafic volcanism ===
Ultramafic tuffs are extremely rare; their characteristic is the abundance of olivine or serpentine and the scarcity or absence of feldspar and quartz.

==== Kimberlites ====
Occurrences of ultramafic tuff include surface deposits of kimberlite at maars in the diamond-fields of southern Africa and other regions. The principal variety of kimberlite is a dark bluish-green, serpentine-rich breccia (blue-ground) which, when thoroughly oxidized and weathered, becomes a friable brown or yellow mass (the "yellow-ground"). These breccias were emplaced as gas–solid mixtures and are typically preserved and mined in diatremes that form intrusive pipe-like structures. At depth, some kimberlite breccias grade into root zones of dikes made of unfragmented rock. At the surface, ultramafic tuffs may occur in maar deposits. Because kimberlites are the most common igneous source of diamonds, the transitions from maar to diatreme to root-zone dikes have been studied in detail. Diatreme-facies kimberlite is more properly called an ultramafic breccia rather than a tuff.

==== Komatiites ====
Komatiite tuffs are found, for example, in the greenstone belts of Canada and South Africa.

==== Red Tuff ====
Red volcanic tuff with reduction spots, from the Carboniferous age, appears red in the field, and underlies basaltic lava flows, at The Sisters (56.060300, -2.714600), weathered pillars of brick-red mudstone, a small volcanic plug, near Bass Rock and North Berwick Law, Scotland. The patterns are similar to those seen on Mars.

=== Folding and metamorphism ===
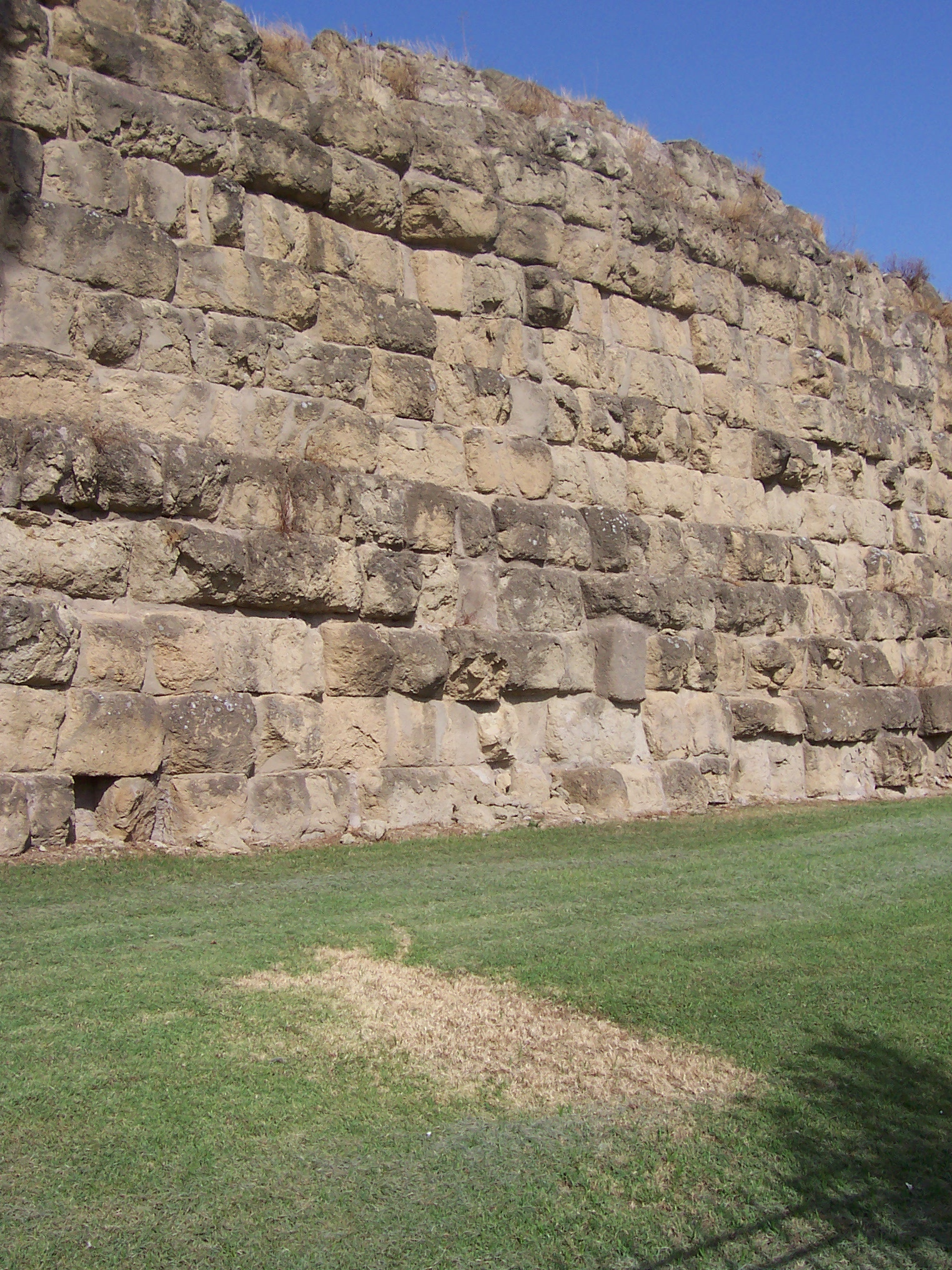
Remains of the ancient Servian Walls in Rome, made of tuff blocks

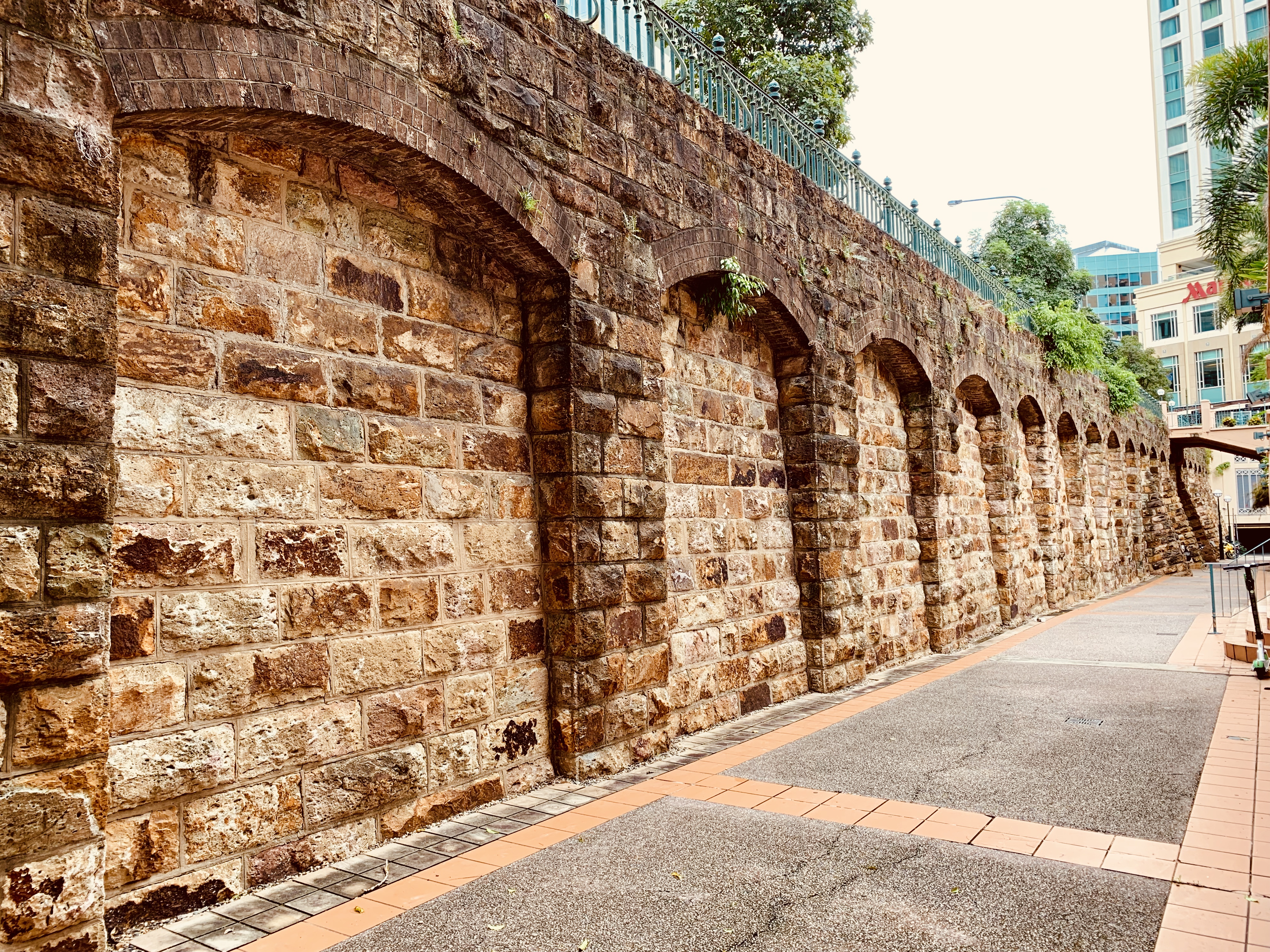
19th-century embankment wall built of Brisbane tuff, City of Brisbane

In course of time, changes other than weathering may overtake tuff deposits. Sometimes, they are involved in folding and become sheared and cleaved. Many of the green slates of the English Lake District are finely cleaved ashes. In Charnwood Forest also, the tuffs are slaty and cleaved. The green color is due to the large development of chlorite. Among the crystalline schists of many regions, green beds or green schists occur, which consist of quartz, hornblende, chlorite or biotite, iron oxides, feldspar, etc., and are probably recrystallized or metamorphosed tuffs. They often accompany masses of epidiorite and hornblende – schists which are the corresponding lavas and sills. Some chlorite-schists also are probably altered beds of volcanic tuff. The "Schalsteins" of Devon and Germany include many cleaved and partly recrystallized ash-beds, some of which still retain their fragmental structure, though their lapilli are flattened and drawn out. Their steam cavities are usually filled with calcite, but sometimes with quartz. The more completely altered forms of these rocks are platy, green chloritic schists; in these, however, structures indicating their original volcanic nature only sparingly occur. These are intermediate stages between cleaved tuffs and crystalline schists.

== Importance ==
The primary economic value of tuff is as a building material. In the ancient world, tuff's relative softness meant that it was commonly used for construction where it was available.

=== Italy ===
Tuff is common in Italy, and the Romans used it for many buildings and bridges. For example, the whole port of the island of Ventotene (still in use), was carved from tuff. The Servian Wall, built to defend the city of Rome in the fourth century BC, is also built almost entirely from tuff. The Romans also cut tuff into small, rectangular stones that they used to create walls in a pattern known as opus reticulatum.

Peperino has been used in Rome and Naples as a building stone, is a trachyte tuff. Pozzolana also is a decomposed tuff, but of basic character, originally obtained near Naples and used as a cement, but this name is now applied to a number of substances not always of identical character. In the historical architecture of Naples, Neapolitan yellow tuff is the most used building material. Piperno ignimbrite tuff was also used widely in Naples and Campania.

=== Germany ===
In the Eifel region of Germany, a trachytic, pumiceous tuff called trass has been extensively worked as a hydraulic mortar. Tuff of the Eifel region of Germany has been widely used for construction of railroad stations and other buildings in Frankfurt, Hamburg, and other large cities. Construction using the Rochlitz Porphyr, can be seen in the Mannerist-style sculpted portal outside the chapel entrance in Colditz Castle. The trade name Rochlitz Porphyr is the traditional designation for a dimension stone of Saxony with an architectural history over 1,000 years in Germany. The quarries are located near Rochlitz.

=== United States ===
Yucca Mountain nuclear waste repository, a U.S. Department of Energy terminal storage facility for spent nuclear reactor and other radioactive waste, is in tuff and ignimbrite in the Basin and Range Province in Nevada. In Napa Valley and Sonoma Valley, California, areas made of tuff are routinely excavated for storage of wine barrels.

=== Rapa Nui ===
Tuff from Rano Raraku was used by the Rapa Nui people of Easter Island to make the vast majority of their famous moai statues.

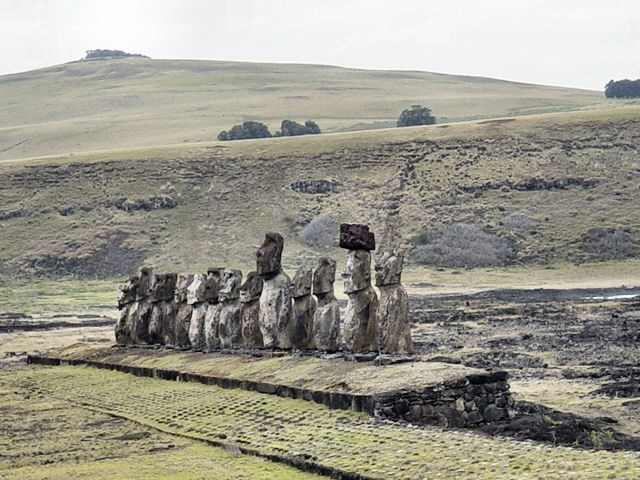
Ahu Tongariki on Easter Island, with 15 moai made of tuff from Rano Raraku crater: The second moai from the right has a Pukao ("topknot") which is made of red scoria.

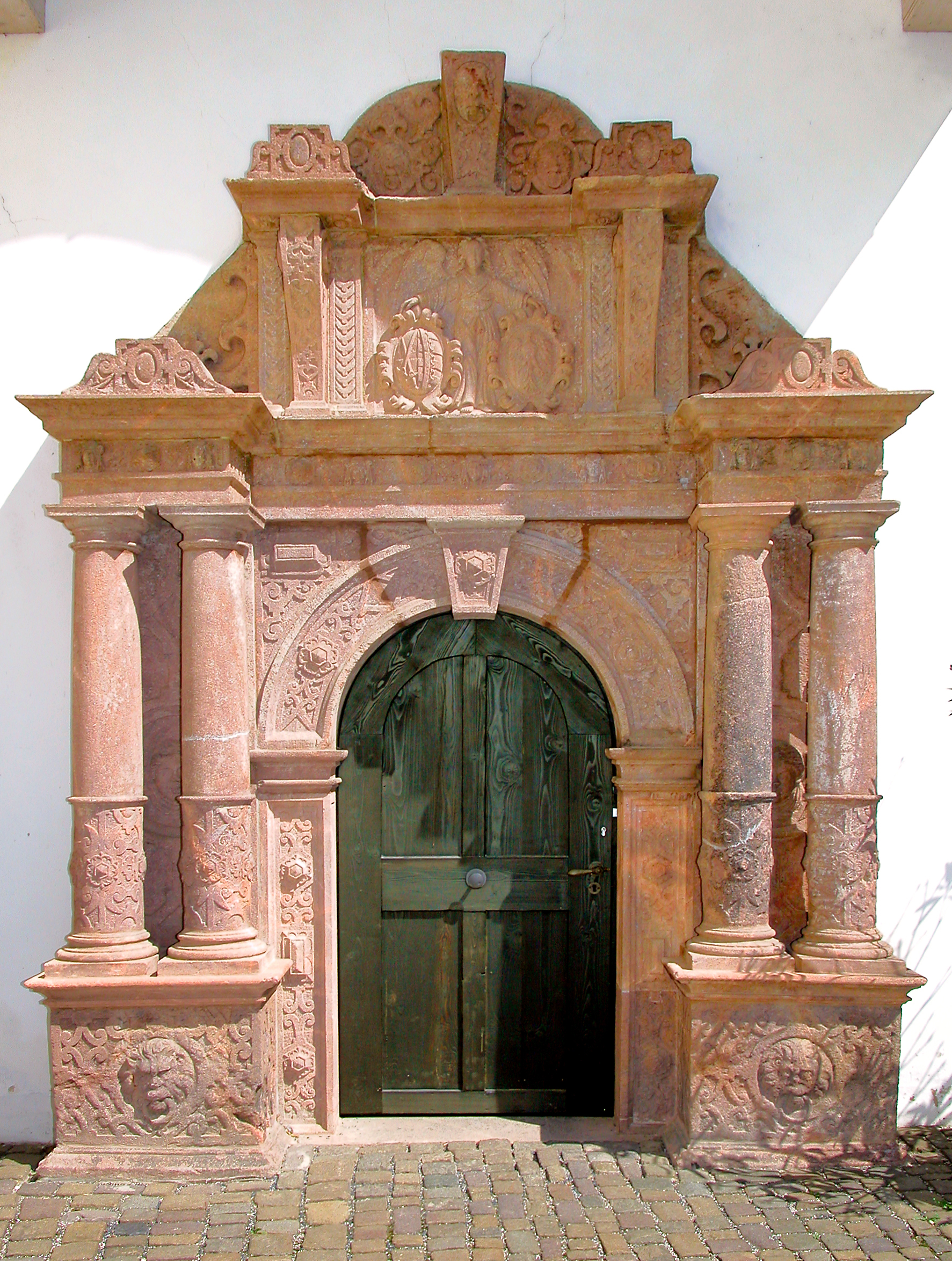
The rhyolitic tuff portal of the "church house" at Colditz Castle, Saxony, designed by Andreas Walther II (1584)

=== Armenia ===
Tuff is used extensively in Armenia and Armenian architecture. It is the dominant type of stone used in construction in Armenia's capital Yerevan, Gyumri, Armenia's second largest city, and Ani, the country's medieval capital, now in Turkey. Tuff mined in the region has a distinctly pink hue to it, giving Yerevan the nickname of "The Pink City"

A small village in Armenia was renamed Tufashen (literally "built of tuff") in 1946.

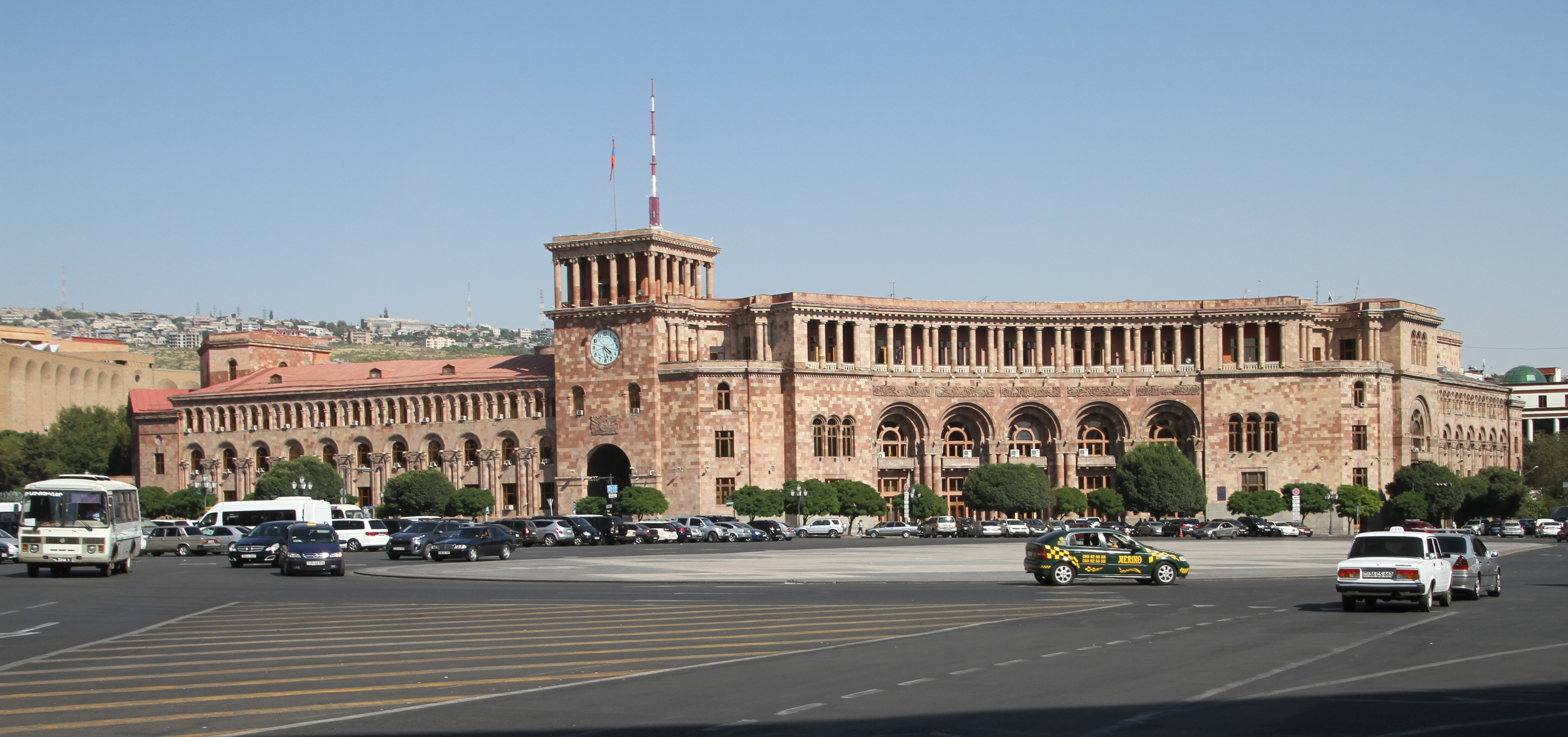
Armenia's Government House in Yerevan's Republic Square, built of tuff

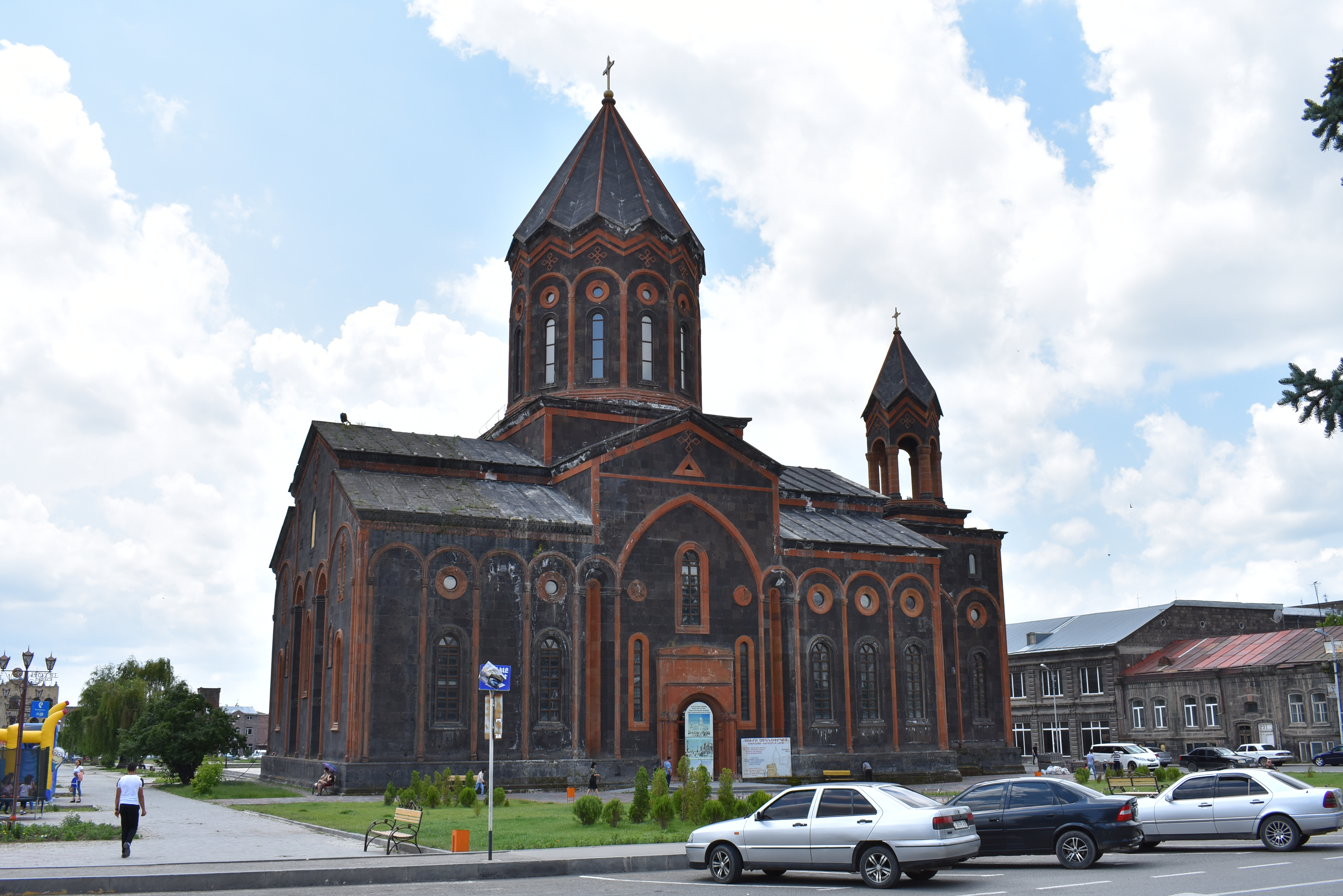
Holy Saviour's Church in Gyumri, built mainly of black tuff

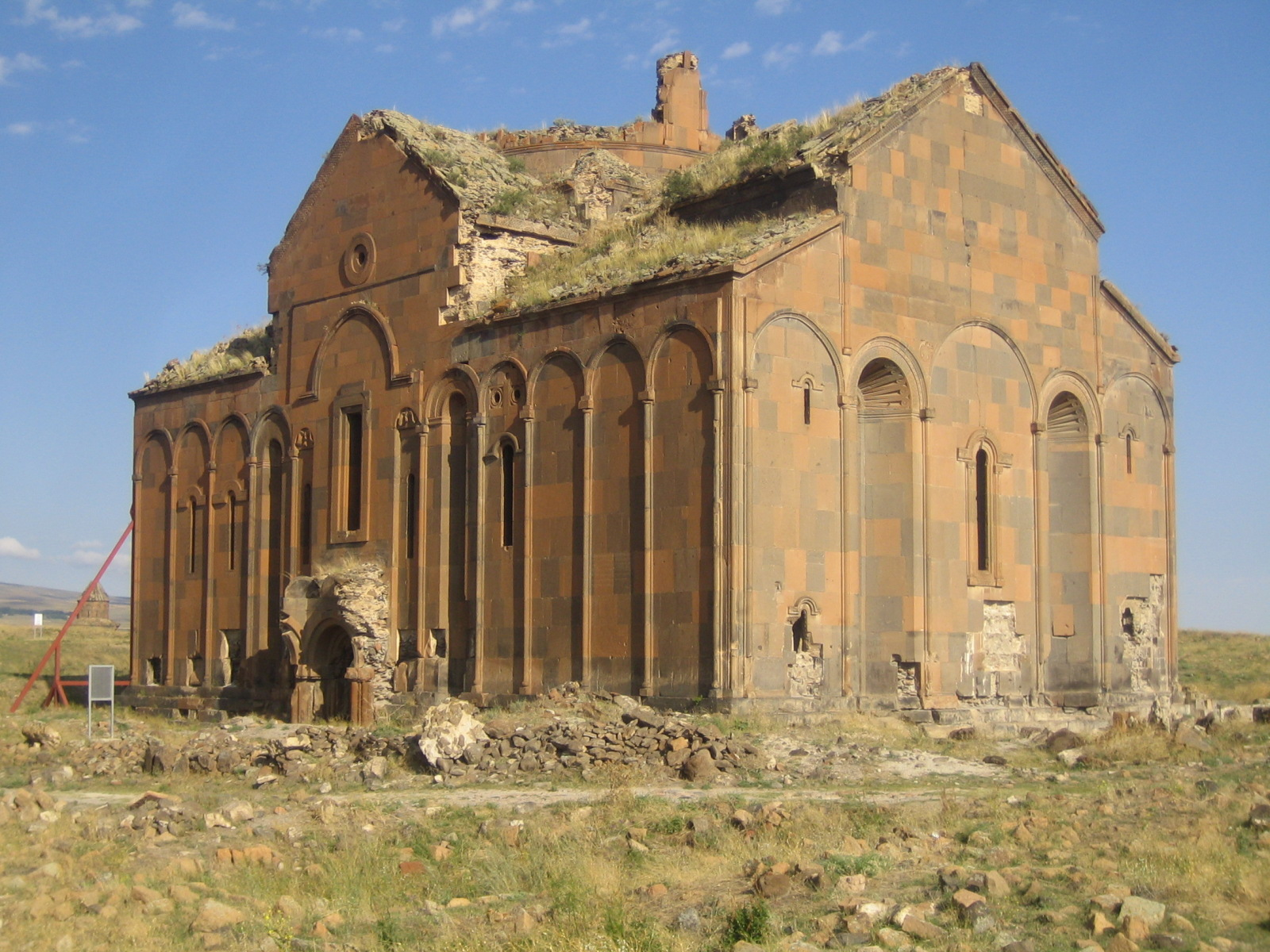
Cathedral of Ani, early 11th century, in the medieval Armenian capital of Ani (modern-day Turkey) was built in tuff.

=== Tephrochronology ===
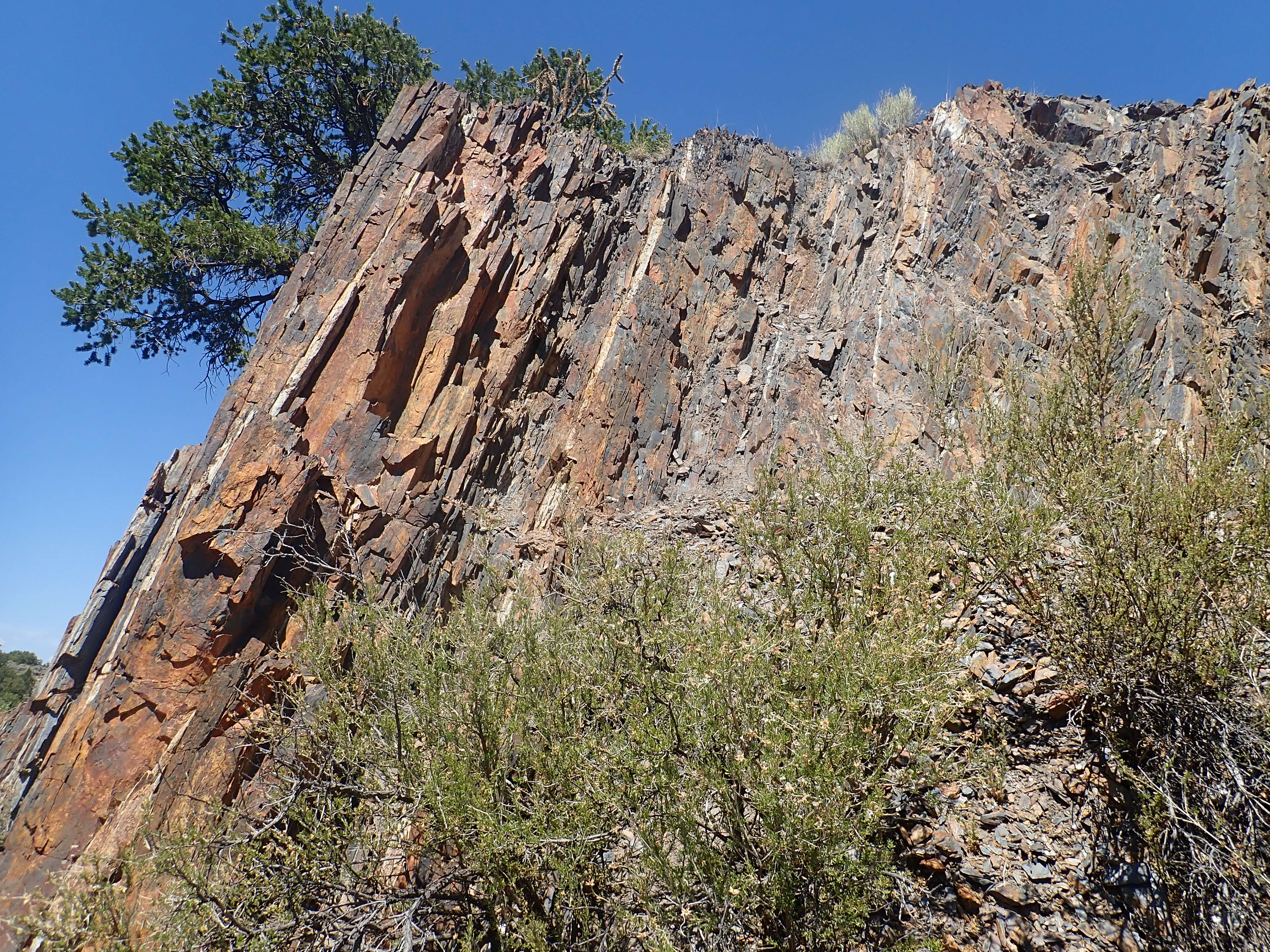
Pilar Formation outcrop showing metatuff beds used for radiometric dating

Tuffs are deposited geologically instantaneously and often over a large region. This makes them highly useful as time-stratigraphic markers. The use of tuffs and other tephra deposits in this manner is known as tephrochronology and is particularly useful for Quaternary chronostratigraphy. Individual tuff beds can be "fingerprinted" by their chemical composition and phenocryst assemblages. Absolute ages for tuff beds can be determined by K-Ar, Ar-Ar, or carbon-14 dating. Zircon grains found in many tuffs are highly durable and can survive even metamorphism of the host tuff to schist, allowing absolute ages to be assigned to ancient metamorphic rocks. For example, dating of zircons in a metamorphosed tuff bed in the Pilar Formation provided some of the first evidence for the Picuris orogeny.

== Etymology ==
The word tuff is derived from the Italian tufo.

== See also ==
- Bentonite – Type of claystone, composed of absorbent smectite clay minerals
- Brisbane tuff
- Eutaxitic texture – Layered or banded texture in some extrusive rock bodies
- Sillar – Variety of rhyolite containing fragments of andesite
- Tuffite – Tuff containing both pyroclastic and detrital materials
- Ignimbrite – Type of volcanic rock, a type of welded tuff
