= Eutaxitic texture =

Layered or banded texture in some extrusive rock bodies

In igneous petrology, eutaxitic texture describes the layered or banded texture in some extrusive rock bodies. It is often caused by the compaction and flattening of glass shards and pumice fragments around undeformed crystals.

== See also ==
- Welded tuff – Rock consolidated from volcanic ash
- Fiamme – Small lens-shaped inclusions in volcaniclastic rocks
- List of rock textures – List of rock textural and morphological terms
