= Deity Figure from Rarotonga =

Oceanian sculpture

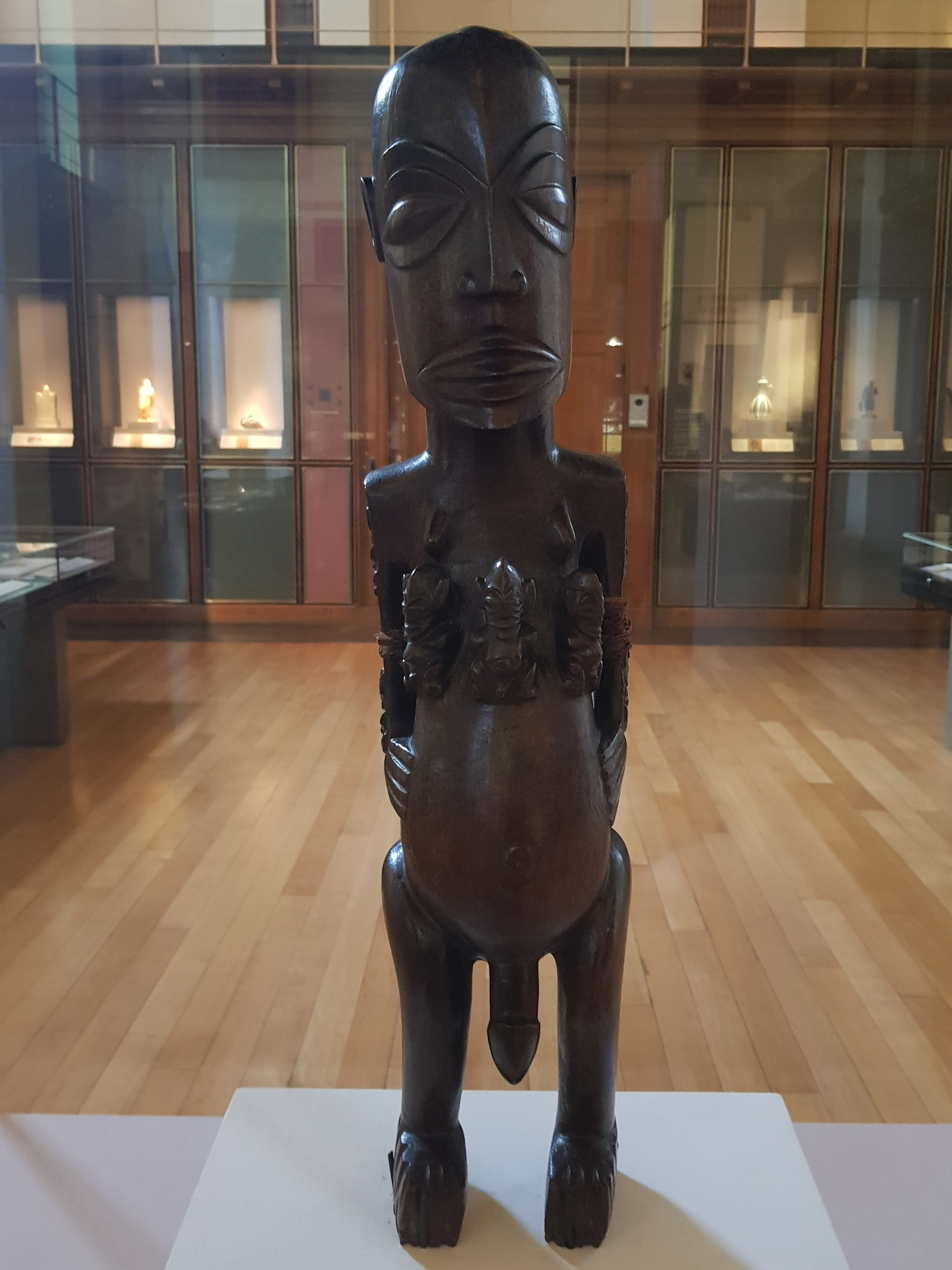
- The deity figure from the island of Rarotonga, Cook Islands
- Material: Wood
- Size: 69 cm high
- Created: Late eighteenth or early nineteenth century AD
- Present location: British Museum, London
- Registration: AOA LMS 169

The Deity Figure from Rarotonga is an important wooden sculpture of a male god that was made on the Pacific island of Rarotonga in the Cook Islands. The cult image was given to English missionaries in the early nineteenth century as the local population converted to Christianity. It was eventually bought by the British Museum in 1911.

== Provenance ==
The wooden figure was made on the island of Rarotonga in the late eighteenth century or early nineteenth century. After Captain James Cook's first sighting of the archipelago in 1773, Europeans began to visit the Cook Islands in the early nineteenth century as part of the colonisation of territories in the Pacific. This went hand-in-hand with mass conversion of the population to Christianity. At that time British missionaries were very active in the area and this idol was probably given up to the London Missionary Society after 1827, when they set up a mission on Rarotonga. The LMS initially loaned their important collection of Polynesian sculptures to the British Museum but later sold it to the national collection in 1911.

== Description ==
The small statue of the god is carved from highly polished ironwood (Casuarina equisetifolia). Shown standing upright, small anthropomorphic figurines are carved in high relief around the chest and arms. Coir bindings along the arm cover remains of a cloth and feathers that would have once been worn by the deity. The exact meaning and name of this masculine idol remains unknown but, based on its artistic style (particularly the distinctive formation of the eyes), it has been attributed to a workshop on the island of Rarotonga. Only one other similar figure, from the George Ortiz collection, is known.

== Gallery ==
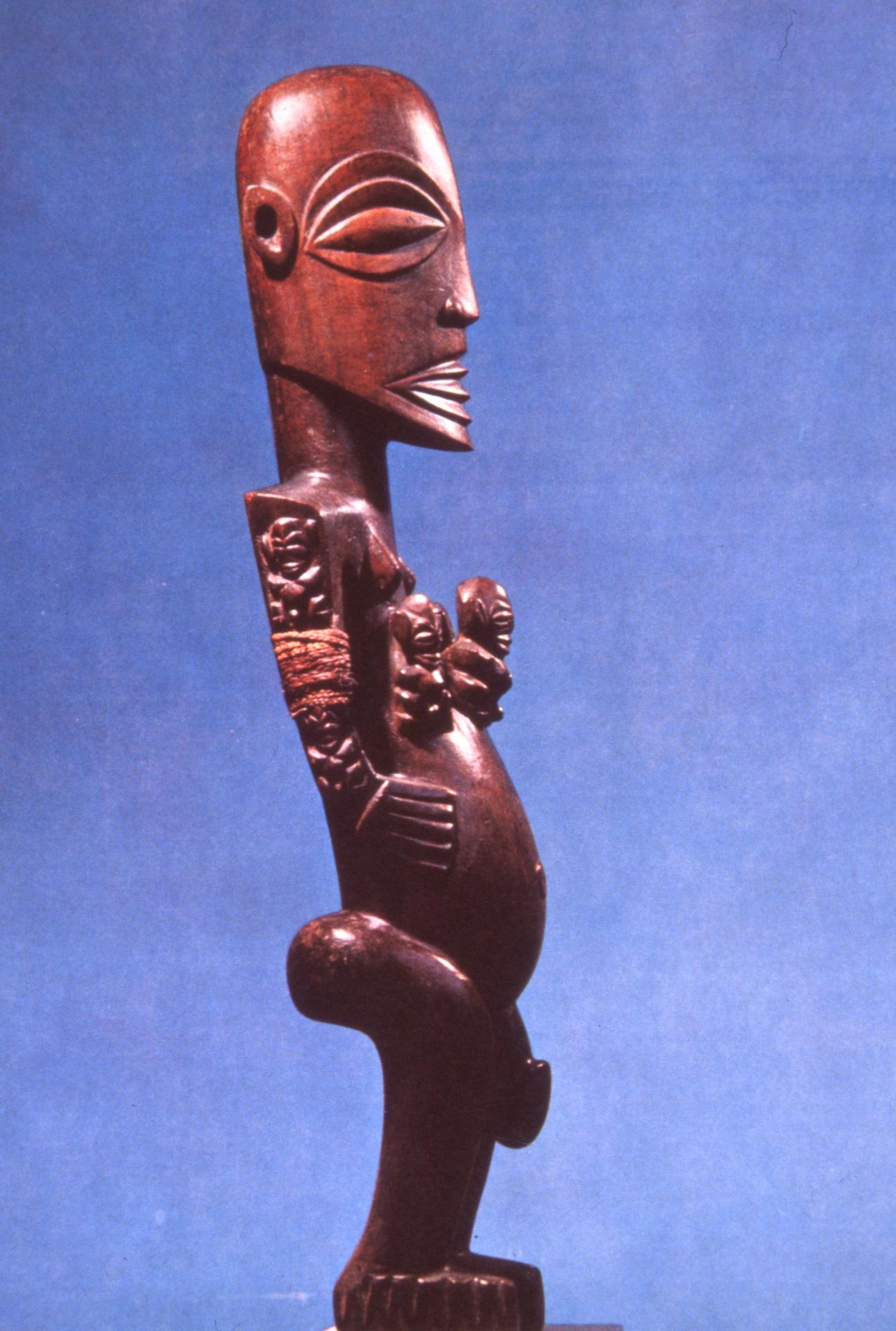
Profile view of the figure

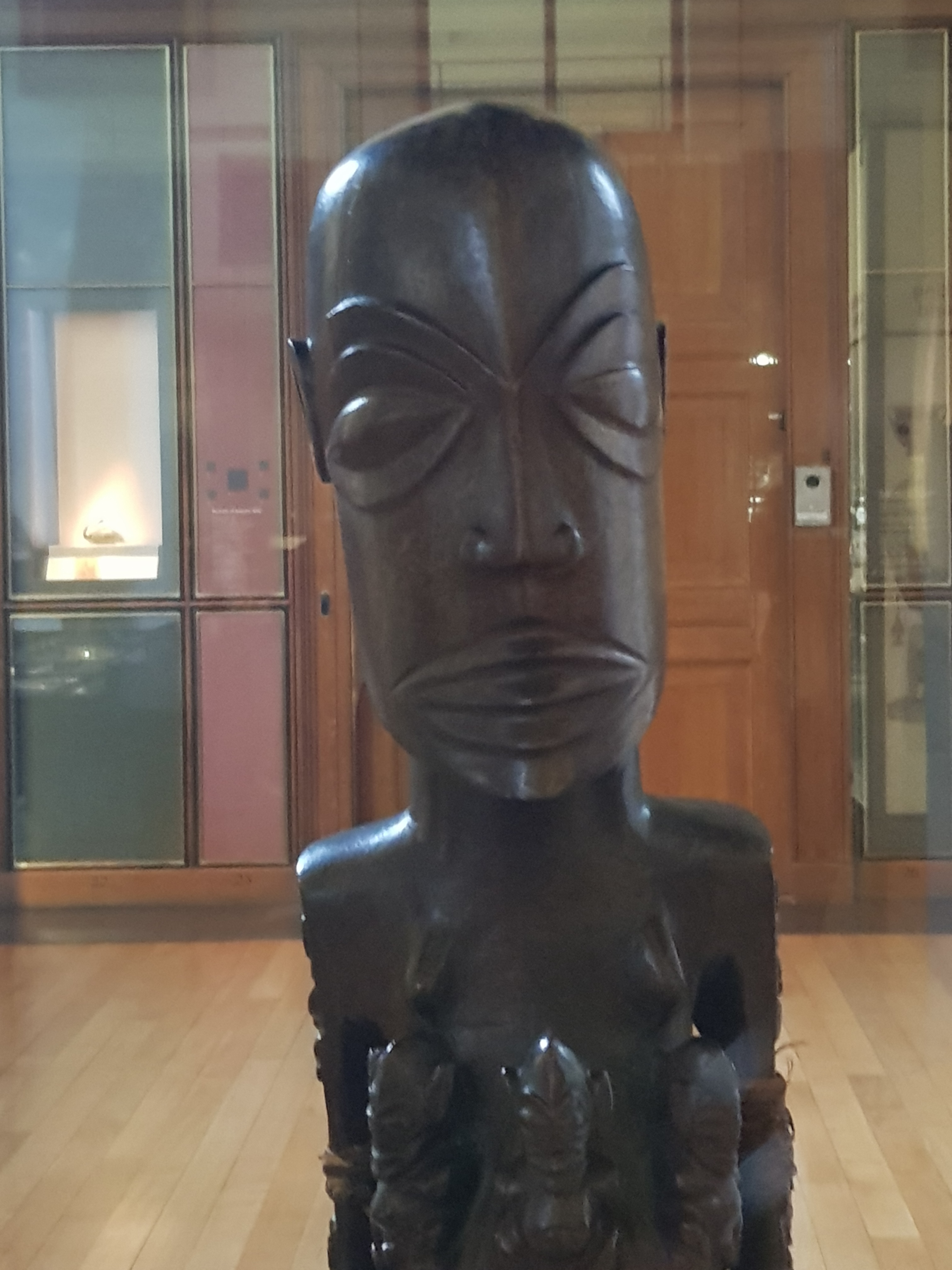
Detailed image of the figure's face

== See also ==
- Hoa Hakananai'a
- Statue of A'a from Rurutu
- Mangareva Statue
