= Relocation of moai =

Since the removal from Easter Island (Rapa Nui) in 1868 of the two moai now displayed at the British Museum, a total of twelve moai are known to have been taken from Easter Island and remain overseas. Some of the moai have been further transferred between museums and private collections, for reasons such as the moai's preservation, academic research and for public education.

== Objects returned to Easter Island ==
In 2006, one relocated moai was repatriated from the Centro Cultural Recoleta in Argentina after 80 years overseas.

In 2022, one moai held in the Chilean National Museum of Natural History in Santiago was returned to the island after over 150 years abroad.

== Objects in museum collections ==
The following table lists the most prominent moai held in museums and collections:

| Material | Height | Current location | Country | Acquisition Date | Reference | Notes | Image |
|---|---|---|---|---|---|---|---|
| Basalt | 2.42 m | The British Museum, London | United Kingdom | 5 November 1868 | 1869.10-5.1 Hoa Hakananai'a | Taken from Easter Island (Rapa Nui) in 1868 by the crew of HMS Topaze and is now on display in the British Museum. (Full article: Hoa Hakananai'a) | |
| Basalt | 1.56 m | The British Museum, London | United Kingdom | 2 November 1868 | 1869.10-6.1 Moai Hava | In the British Museum's Oceanic collection | |
| Tuff | 1.85 m | Musée du Quai Branly – Jacques Chirac, Paris | France | 1872 | 71.1930.35.1 | Formerly presented in the Musée de l'Homme, then moved to the new Musée du Quai Branly. | |
| Lapilli tuff | 2.24 m | Department of Anthropology, National Museum of Natural History, Smithsonian Institution, Washington D.C. | United States | December 1886 | E128368-0 (EISP# SI-WDC-001) | Removed from Ahu O'Pepe. | |
| Tuff | 1.194 m | Department of Anthropology, National Museum of Natural History, Smithsonian Institution, Washington D.C. | United States | December 1886 | E128370-0 (EISP# SI-WDC-002) | Removed from Ahu O'Pepe. | |
| Tuff | 1.70 m | Pavillon des Sessions, Musée du Louvre, Paris | France | 1934-35 | MH.35.61.1 | Presented to the Chilean government by Henri Lavachery and Alfred Metraux for the Musée de l'Homme after their expedition to Rapa Nui, in 1934-35. | |
| Red scoria | 0.42 m | Pavillon des Sessions, Musée du Louvre, or the Musée de l'Homme, Paris | France | 1934-35 | MH.35.61.66 | Removed by the Lavachery, Metraux and Watelin expedition. | |
| Basalt | 3 m | Royal Museums of Art and History, Brussels | Belgium | 1934-35 | ET.35.5.340 or Pou hakanononga | Removed by the Lavachery, Metraux and Watelin expedition. The oldest known statue to date. | |
| Trachyte | 1.6 m | Otago Museum, Dunedin | New Zealand | 1929 | D29.6066 | Moai and pukao were removed from Rapa Nui in 1881 by Alexander Ariʻipaea Salmon and shipped aboard the Nautilus to the Maison Brander plantation in Pape'ete, Tahiti. They were sold to Otago Museum in 1928 by Norman Brander and arrived in Dunedin on 15 April 1929. | |
| Tuff | 2.81 m | Corporacion Museo de Arqueologia e Historia Francisco Fonck, Viña del Mar | Chile | | 1174 (EISP# MF-VDM-001) | | |
| Tuff | 2.94 m | Salón de la Polinesia, Museo arqueologico, La Serena | Chile | | | Displayed in Europe, then moved to the Salón de la Polinesia in Chile. | |

== Issues of authenticity ==
The issue of authenticity of moai heads may never be fully resolved. The fact is that the rocks used to carve the heads are as old as the volcano eruption that formed them, so carbon 14 testing reveals no evidence of authenticity. The age of the moai heads on the island cannot be determined, and off the island, heads can only be determined to be made from Easter Island volcanic rock or not made from Easter Island volcanic rock. Determining the age of an Easter Island moai head is therefore an art, and not a science. Field experts make judgments and express opinions about what tools they feel were used and attempt to tie an age to that opinion. Such a condition means that moai heads cannot be tested with hope of determining authenticity; they may, however, be brought under suspicion of being fakes. As with any object of antiquity, the patrimony, the history and story of the heads, is an important part in determining authenticity.

An unauthenticated moai head entitled "Henry" currently stands in the Forest Lawn Memorial Park, Glendale, California. It was obtained in the first half of the 20th century by the founder of the park Dr. Hubert Eaton. Dr. Eaton allegedly received the moai in a legal transaction between Rapanui fishermen at Easter Island who were using the head (approx 1m height) as ballast for a boat. The Memorial Park has no plans for authenticating or testing the moai in the near future.

In 2003, the Chilean government began an investigation into two moai heads within a set of 15 other Easter Island artefacts — the possessions of Hernan Garcia de Gonzalo Vidal — which were put on sale at The Cronos Gallery in Miami. After a photographic inspection by Patricia Vargas, an archaeologist at the University of Chile's Easter Island institute, she commented that "They might be nice art pieces, but I doubt any one is 500 years old. It appears that the cuts have been made with modern machinery and not with stone tools." A meeting arranged between the Chilean newspaper El Mercurio which first reported the sale, and Hernan Garcia Gonzalo de Vidal, later failed to take place when Gonzalo de Vidal became unavailable due to a "family emergency".

=== Replicas ===
In 1968, a moai was taken from Rapa Nui and displayed in New York City as a publicity stunt to oppose the building of a jet refueling facility on Easter Island. Around the time of the campaign and the following tour to Washington D.C. and Chicago, the moai was received by the Lippincott company of North Haven, Connecticut, which since its inception in 1966 had provided a "place for artists to create large sculptures and receive help in transportation and installation of their work". In co-operation with the International Fund for Monuments Inc, Lippincott produced a copy from the original moai (before it was confiscated by the Chilean government) and claimed the rights to execute the work on 100 further replicas.

Moai replicas are displayed, among others, outside the Natural History Museum of Los Angeles County; at the Auckland War Memorial Museum in New Zealand; and at the American Museum of Natural History in New York.

A group of seven replica moai arranged in an Ahu exist in the city of Nichinan, Miyazaki Prefecture on the Japanese island of Kyushu. The statues were built and installed in 1996 for the opening of the seaside park Sun Messe Nichinan, of which the statues are the park's centrepiece.

In 2000, the Embassy of Chile in the United States presented a moai replica, with a pair of reconstructed eyes, to the American University.

== See also ==
- 2010 Easter Island moai referendum
