= Statue of A'a from Rurutu =

Wooden sculpture of the god A'a

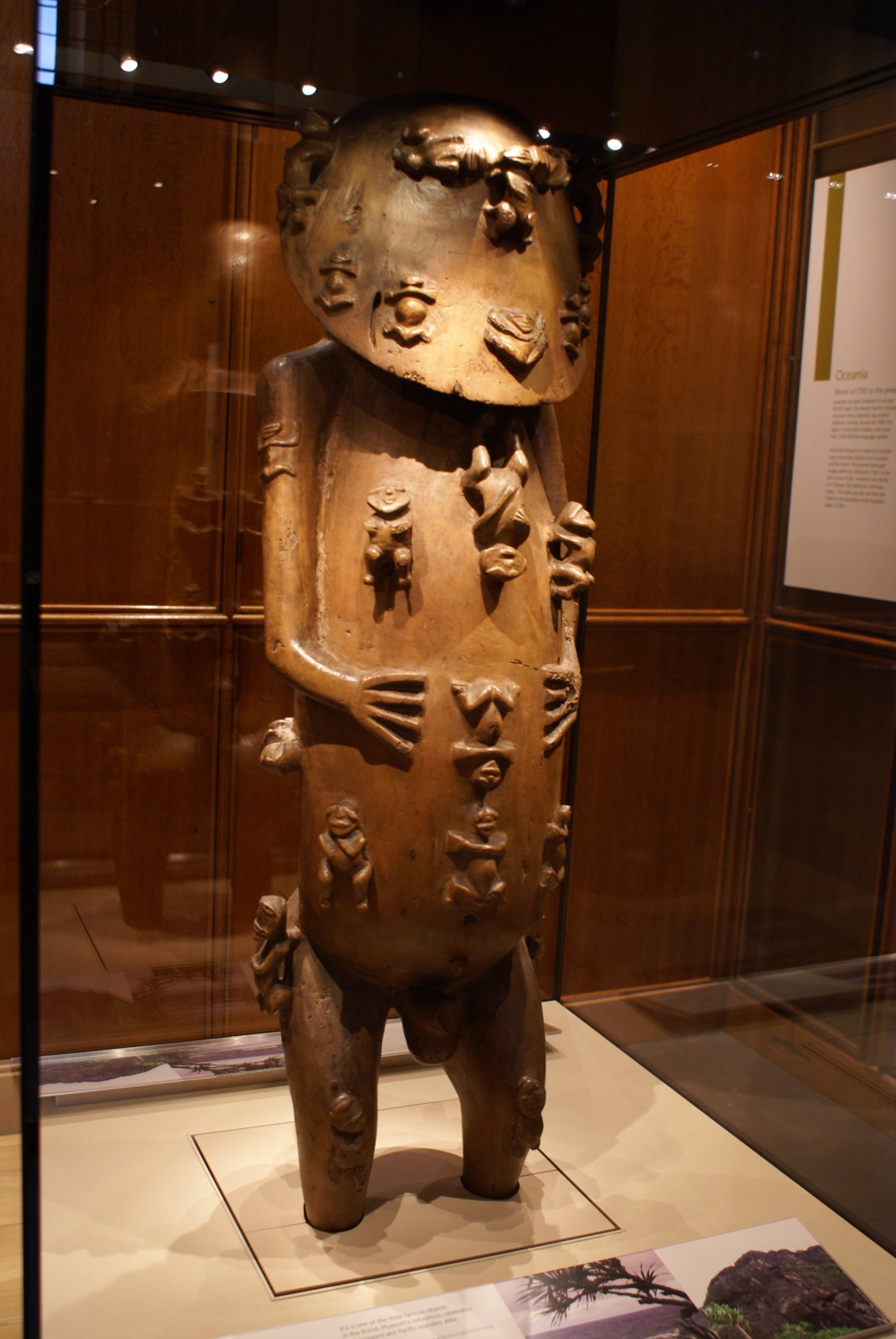
- The A'a Idol from Rurutu in the British Museum
- Material: Wood
- Size: 1.17 metres high
- Created: before 1821 (probably 1591–1647)
- Present location: British Museum, London
- Registration: Oc,LMS.19

A wooden sculpture of the god A'a was made on the Pacific island of Rurutu in the Austral archipelago most likely in the late 1500s to mid 1600s. In the early nineteenth century, the sculpture was given by the islanders to the London Missionary Society to mark their conversion to Christianity. Subsequently, the sculpture was brought back to England to be displayed, first in the museum of the LMS and then in the British Museum. The figure of A'a is famous as one of the finest surviving pieces of Polynesian sculpture, and in the twenty-first century the sculpture is, according to Julie Adams, curator of the Oceania collection at the British Museum, "an international celebrity".

== Description ==
The statue of A'a is a wooden anthropomorphic figure, 117 cm (approx. 46 in) high and 36 cm (approx. 14 in) wide. It is, in the estimation of Alfred Gell, "arguably the finest extant piece of Polynesian sculpture". The figure is hollow, and has a removable back panel allowing access to the interior. The sculpture's arms are carved in high relief; its legs are separated and slightly bent. The figure has no feet or base, and it is unknown if it did when it was created. The lower legs, right buttock, and left arm of the sculpture are damaged, and the penis has been broken off completely. While the other damage could be the result of deterioration over time, the severing of the figure's penis appears to have been deliberate, though it is not known whether it was by British missionaries or Polynesian converts.

Thirty smaller figures are carved on the surface of the statue. Many of these are positioned to mark features on the human body, such as the eyes, nose, and mouth, though some do not obviously correspond with any human feature. The figures are carved in two distinct styles; sixteen of the figures are upright with arms over the torso, while fourteen lie spread-eagled, with arms and legs outstretched. Possibly these two distinct styles of figure are intended to represent male and female forms respectively. These figures are symmetrically distributed across A'a, with the exception of those on the lower abdomen, where there is an upright figure on the right side of A'a and a splayed figure on the left. It is not clear whether this asymmetry was deliberate.

== History ==
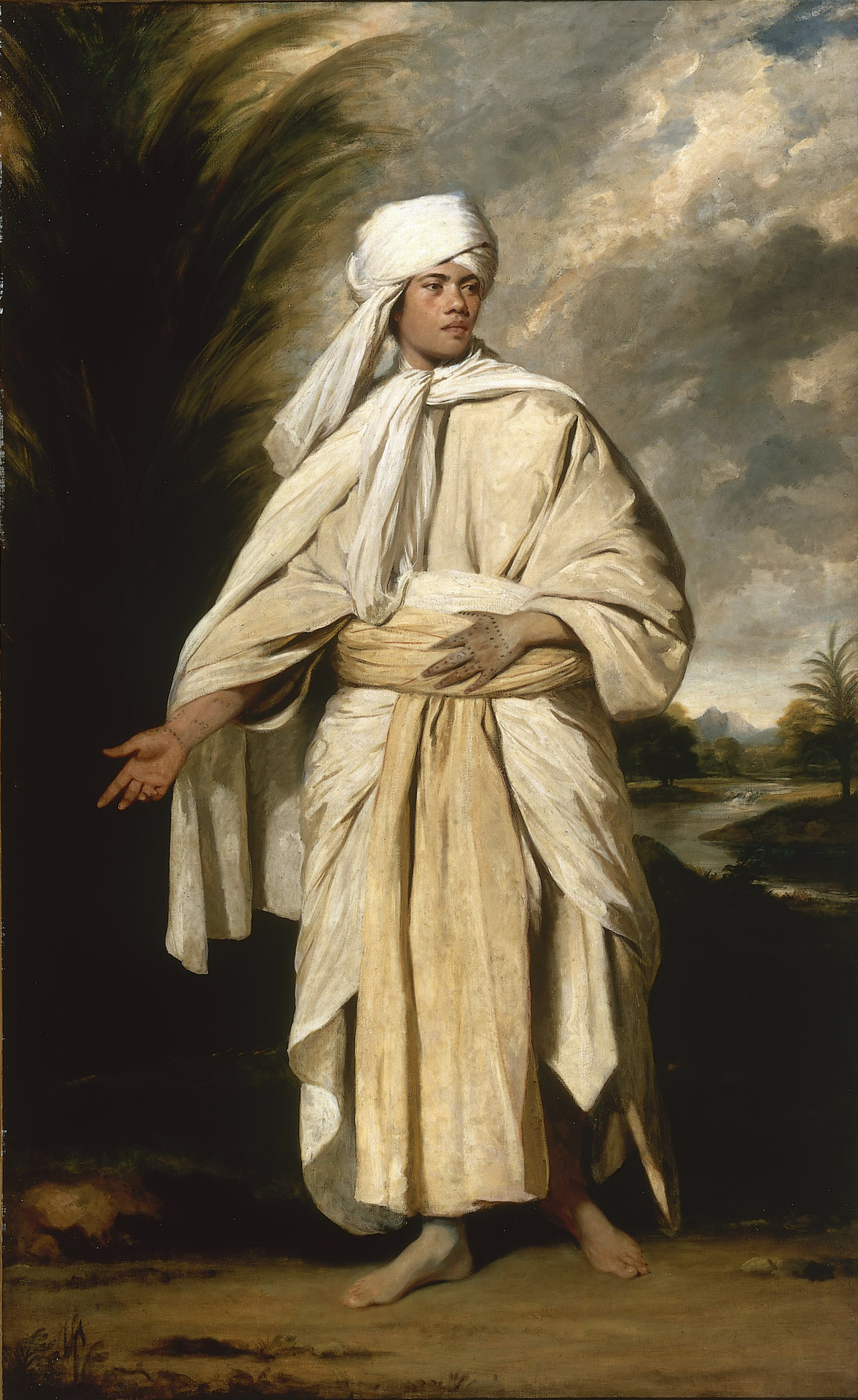
Portrait of Omai by Joshua Reynolds. According to one Rurutuan tradition, A'a was carved by Amaiterai, who has been identified with Omai, the second Pacific Islander known to visit Europe.

The statue of A'a is first recorded in 1821 when, on 9 August that year, it was presented to the missionaries of the LMS on Ra'iatea, the second largest of the Society Islands in French Polynesia. It had been brought there from Rurutu, where it was made. The sculpture itself could be much older: radiocarbon dating carried out in 2015 suggests that A'a was created between 1591 and 1647. According to Rurutuan tradition, A'a is made from the wood of the pua keni keni (Fagraea berteriana) that is native to islands in the eastern Pacific, though tests conducted in 2015 suggested that the figure is in fact made from sandalwood, possibly Santalum insulare. A'a was probably made using stone-bladed tools, though if it was made after the arrival of Europeans to Polynesia in the 1760s iron tools may also have been used in its construction. Ray or shark skin rasps, breadfruit leaves, cowrie shells and coconut oil would have been used to finish and polish the statue.

According to a Rurutuan tradition, A'a was carved by Amaiterai, who had visited London and encountered the Christian god there. The cavity originally, according to this story, held three figures, representing the three elements of the Trinity – God the Father, God the Son, and God the Holy Spirit. It has been suggested that Amaiterai in this story was in fact Omai, who in 1774 had become the second Pacific Islander known to visit Europe. The name "Amaiterai", the legendary creator of A'a, may be a corruption of "Omaiterai", or "Omai the Great".

In 1821, A'a was given to missionaries from the London Missionary Society based on the island of Ra'iatea, as a symbol of the islanders' conversion to Christianity. It was sent back to London by these missionaries, and became part of the collection of the LMS museum. From 1890, the LMS loaned much of its collection of Polynesian art, including A'a, to the British Museum; in 1911 the Museum acquired the sculpture. It is not currently on display in the museum, but since the 1980s has been exhibited around the world, including in New York, Canberra, Paris, and London. In 2023, the British Museum loaned the statue to the Musée de Tahiti et des Îles for three years.

== Context ==
The works acquired by the British Museum from the London Missionary Society make up some of the best-known works of Polynesian art, including A'a. A'a itself, though part of a corpus of Polynesian god-figures with features such as the smaller figures on the body, large head, and rounded stomach, is according to Julie Adams "recognized by experts as a unique figure in Polynesian art". A god figure from Rarotonga, also in the collection of the British Museum, has three male humanoid figures carved in high relief on its torso, similar to those which cover A'a.

== Purpose ==
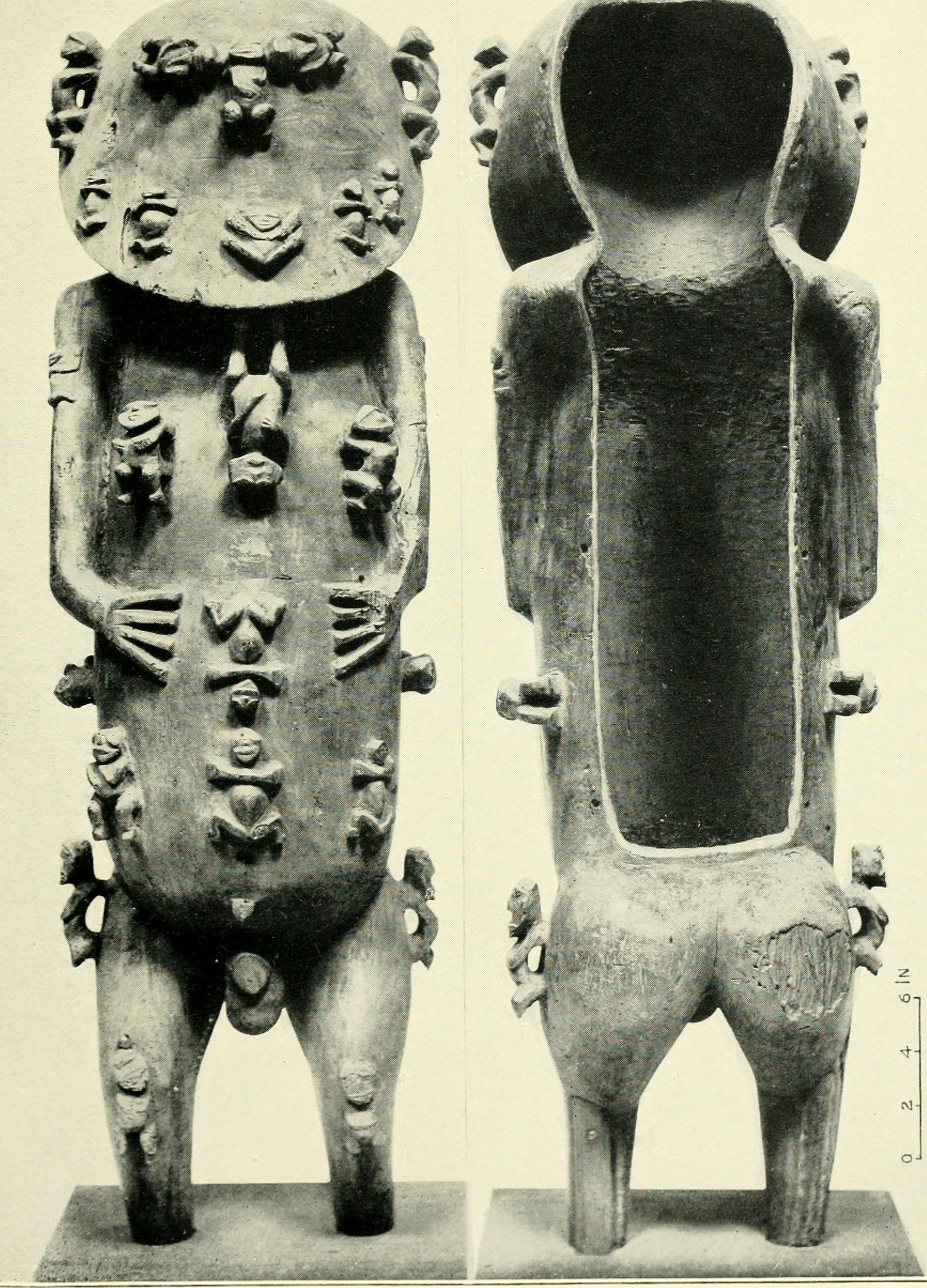
Image from the Handbook to the Ethnographical Collections (1910)

When A'a was brought to the LMS missionaries in 1821, 24 "small gods" were found inside its cavity. It has long been believed that A'a was originally constructed to hold these small gods. However, the size and shape of the cavity suggest that it was originally created to hold some other objects – an assortment of small gods could have equally been housed in a much simpler cavity. Anthropologist Steven Hooper argues that in fact A'a was originally created as a casket to house the bones of a revered ancestor; the small gods were only placed into A'a for ease of transport to Ra'iatea.

== Identification ==
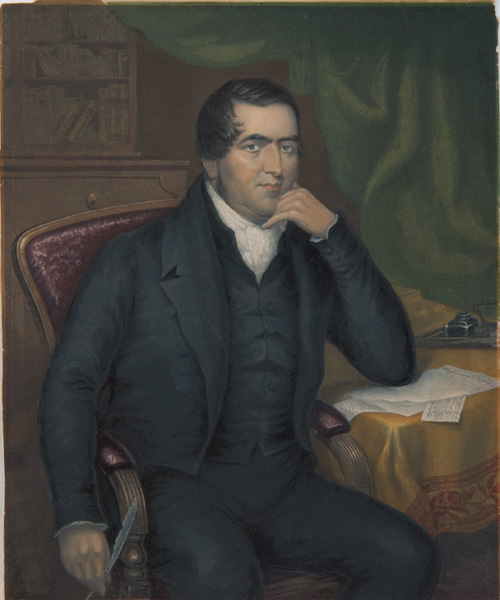
John Williams, who witnessed the presentation of the sculpture to the LMS, identified it as the god A'a.

John Williams, one of the missionaries who witnessed A'a being presented to the LMS on Ra'iatea, identified the sculpture as representing the god "Aa", both in a letter of 1822 to the directors of the LMS informing them that the sculpture was being delivered, and in his 1837 book about his experiences in Polynesia. Lancelot Threlkeld – another missionary, whose boat brought the gods of Rurutu to Raiatea – likewise described the figure as "the great god Aa". However, in 1824 the LMS' publication Missionary Sketches referred to the sculpture as "Taaroa Upoo Vahu", under which name the sculpture was also recorded in the 1826 LMS museum catalogue. According to Julian Harding, "there is little or no evidence" for Ellis' identification of the figure as Ta'aroa.

The name "A'a" is not otherwise known in Polynesian cosmology, but Ta'aroa was a Polynesian creator-god, though not one known from the indigenous traditions of Rurutu: possibly because the local cult of A'a had displaced it. Anthropologist Anne Lavondès suggests that "A'a" was a general term for this type of god-figure, rather than the specific name of the god itself, while the scholar Niel Gunson, who specialises in Pacific history, identifies A'a with the father god Avatea.

== Copies ==
After the statue of A'a had been loaned to the British Museum, the museum made a cast of A'a to be displayed at an exhibition at the museum of the LMS. A number of other casts were subsequently made at the request of museums around the world. Copies of the figure have also been acquired by individual collectors, including the artists Roland Penrose, Pablo Picasso, and Henry Moore, and a cast of A'a is today displayed in the mayor's office on Rurutu.

== See also ==
- Hoa Hakananai'a
- Mangareva Statue

== Sources ==
=== Books ===
- Adams, Julie; Hooper, Steven; Nuku, Maia (2016). A'a: A Deity from Polynesia. London: The British Museum Press.
- Gell, Alfred (1998). Art and Agency: An Anthropological Theory. Oxford: Clarendon Press.
- Lavondès, Anne (1996). "L'histoire de A'A de Rurutu et l'évolution des mythes". In Julien, M.; Orliac, M.; Gérard, Bertrand; Lavondès, Anne; Lavondès, H.; Robineau, Claude (eds.). Mémoire de pierre, mémoire d'homme: tradition et archéologie en Océanie: hommage à José Garanger. Paris: Publications de la Sorbonne.

=== Journals ===
- Hooper, Steven (2007). "Embodying Divinity: The Life of A'a". The Journal of the Polynesian Society. 116 (2).
- Gunson, Niel (2014). "Sacred Gods From Polynesia". The Journal of Pacific History. 49 (4): 501–507. doi:10.1080/00223344.2014.975912. S2CID 161692694.
