= Mangareva Statue =

Oceanian wooden sculpture

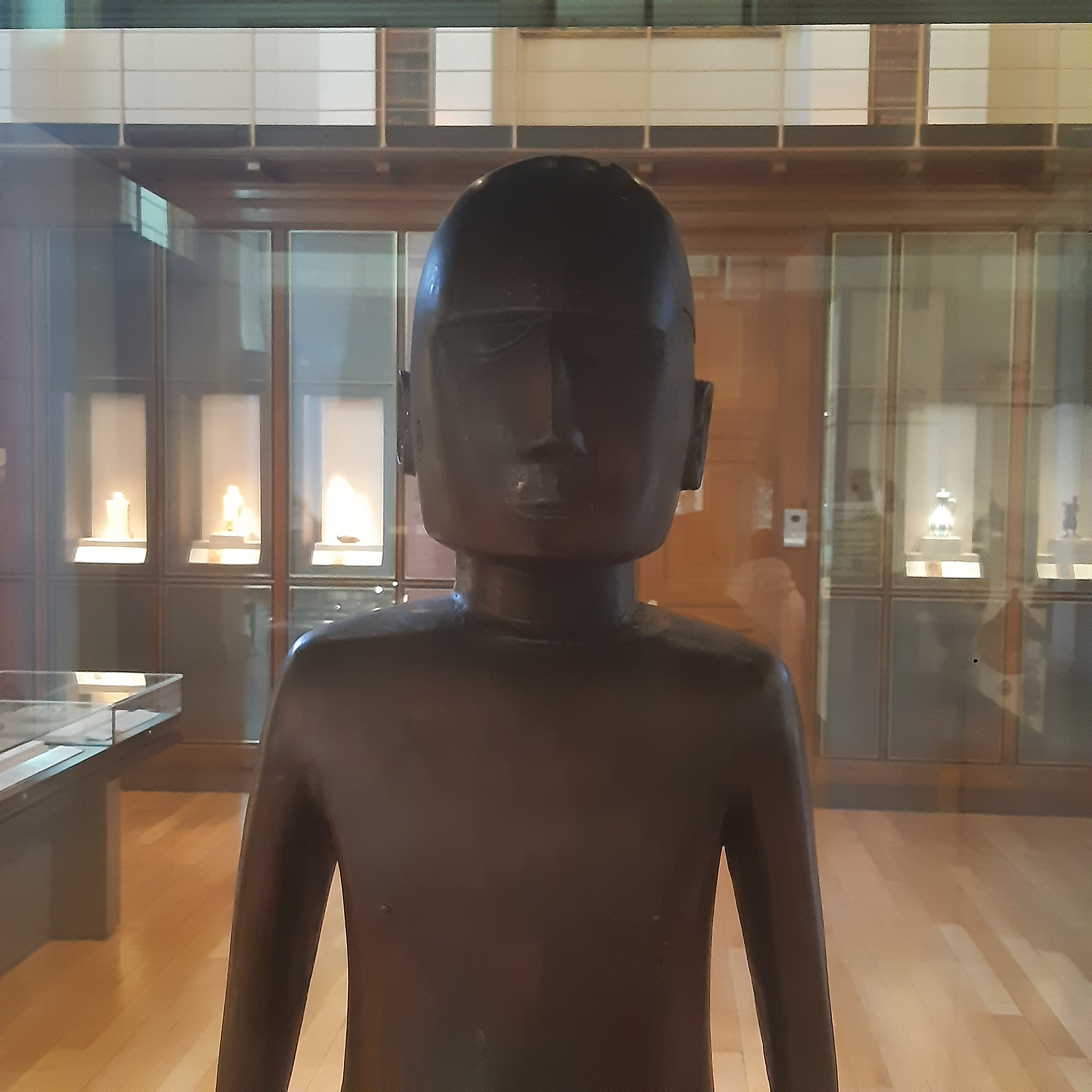
- Detail of the Mangareva Statue in the British Museum
- Material: Wood
- Size: 115 cm high
- Created: Late eighteenth or early nineteenth century AD
- Present location: British Museum, London
- Registration: AOA LMS 99

The Mangareva Statue or Deity Figure from Mangareva is a wooden sculpture of a male god that was made on the Pacific island of Mangareva in French Polynesia. The cult image was given to English missionaries in the early nineteenth century as the local population converted to Christianity. It was eventually bought by the British Museum in 1911.

== Provenance ==
The wooden figure was made on the island of Mangareva in the late eighteenth century or early nineteenth century. The first Europeans to land on the island were from HMS Blossom under Captain Beechey in 1824. Soon afterwards, French missionaries converted the local population to Christianity. In 1835, Father Honoré Laval and Father François d'Assise Caret, with support of the reigning King Maputeoa and the former high priest Matua, destroyed most of what remained of the indigenous artwork, although Caret sent a few pieces to Europe. At that time, British missionaries were also active in the area and this idol was probably given up to the London Missionary Society in the 1820s. The LMS initially loaned their important collection of Polynesian sculptures to the British Museum but later sold it to the national collection in 1911.

== Description ==
The large figure of a local god is carved from highly polished wood indigenous to the archipelago. It is relatively intact with only parts of its arms and feet missing. The standing male deity has a large head with distinctive features that are unique to artwork from the island. The exact meaning and name of this idol has not been definitively identified, although scholars think it may represent either the Polynesian god of agriculture Rongo or the principal god of Mangareva, Tu. Two types of figures were sent to Europe in the nineteenth century: The first group, of which this is an example, were anthropomorphic in design; the second (and rarer) group were more abstract.

== Gallery ==
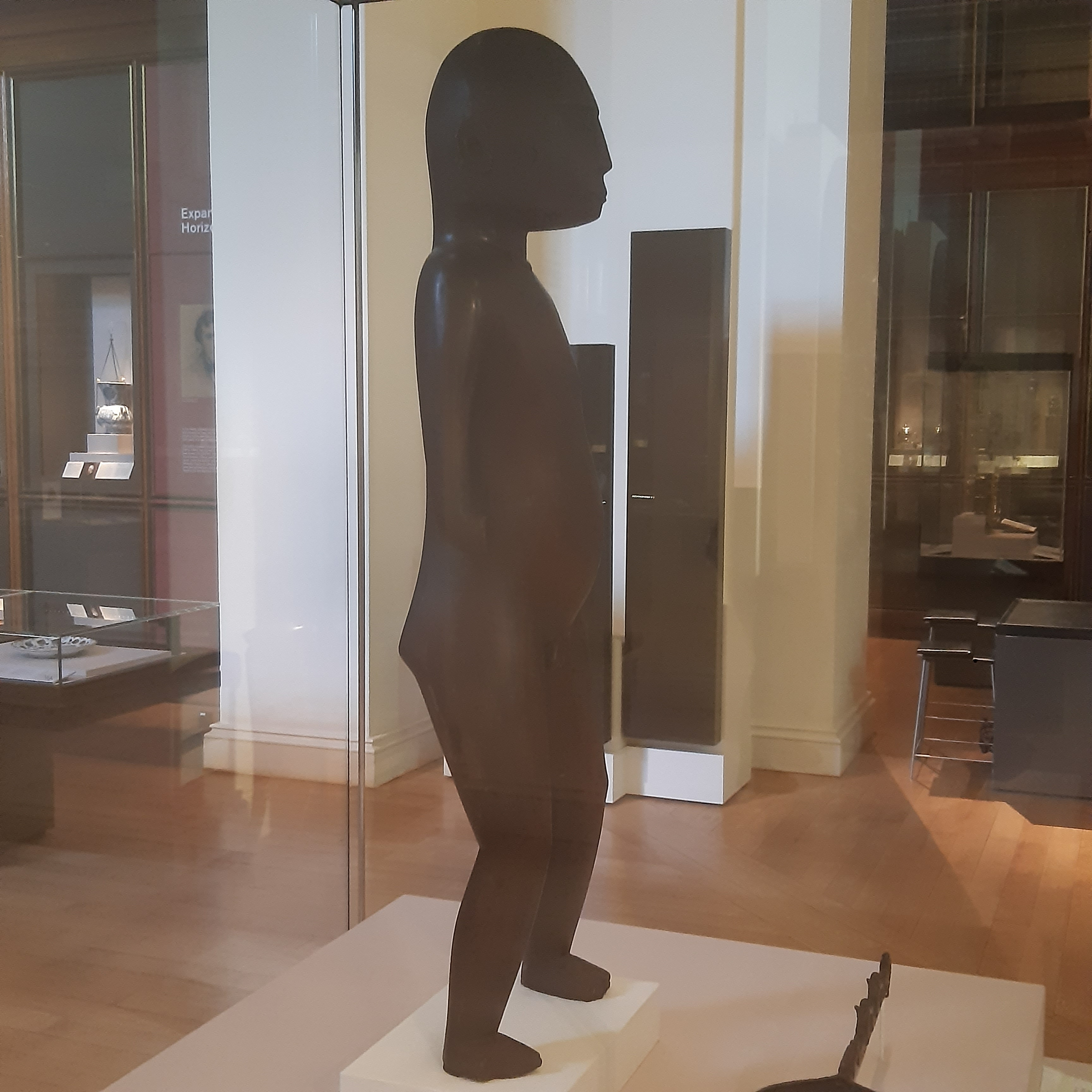
Another image of the British Museum sculpture

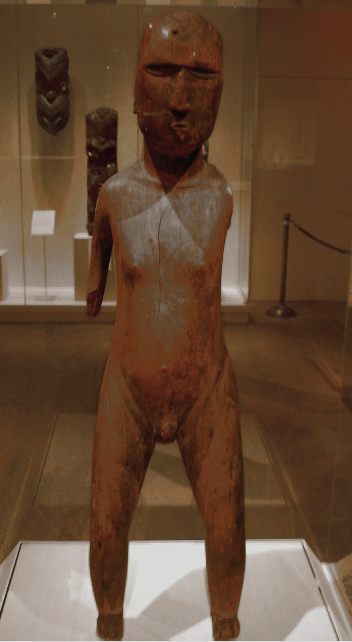
Similar sculpture held by the Metropolitan Museum in New York

== See also ==
- Mangarevan mythology
- Hoa Hakananai'a
- Statue of A'a from Rurutu
- Deity Figure from Rarotonga
