= HMS Topaze (1858) =

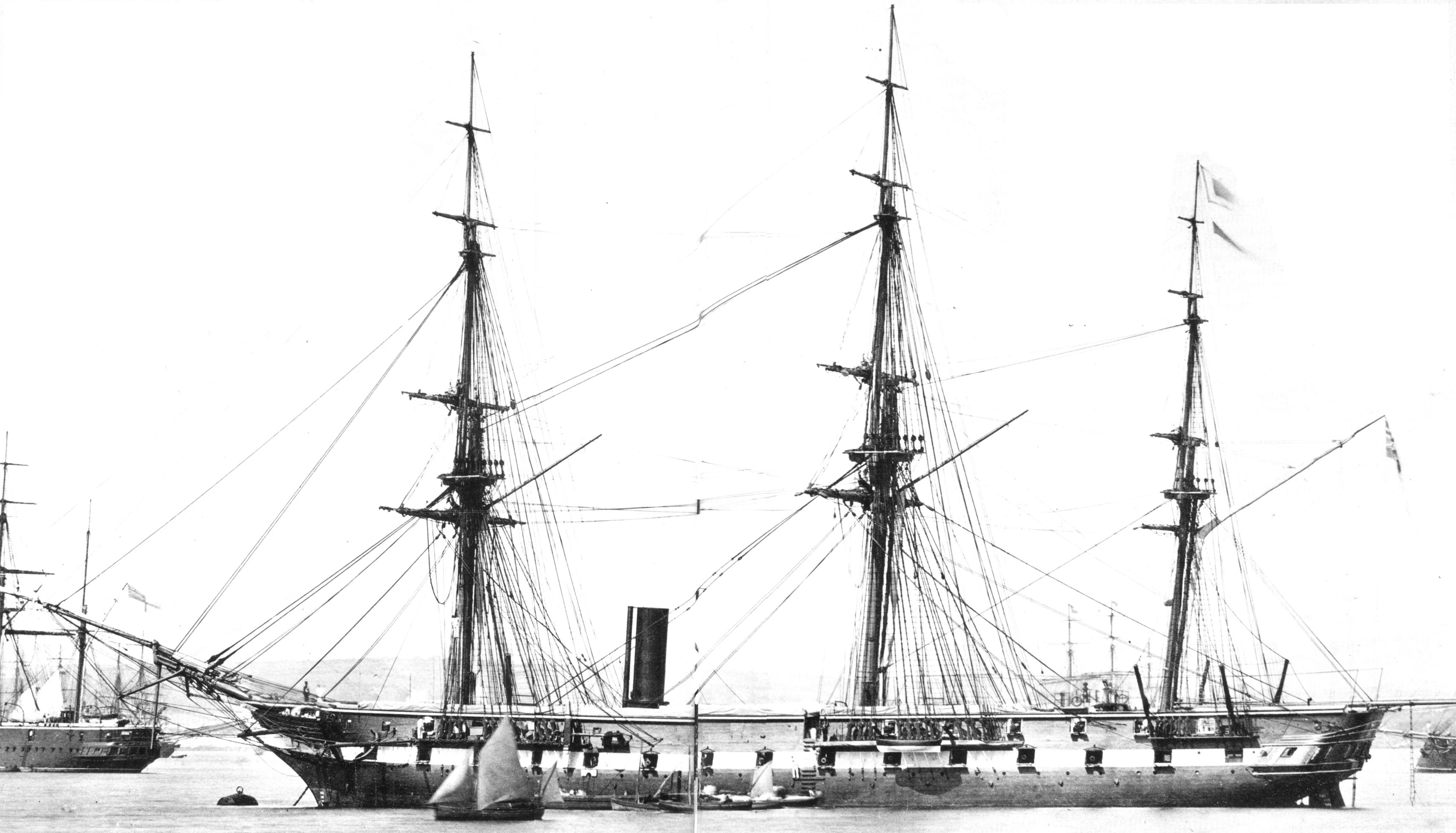

History

United Kingdom
- Name: HMS Topaze
- Launched: 12 May 1858, Devonport
- Commissioned: 11 June 1859
- Decommissioned: 28 June 1878
- Fate: Sold on 14 February 1884 and broken up at Charlton

General characteristics
- Class & type: Liffey-class frigate
- Displacement: 3,915 tons
- Tons burthen: 2,659 bm
- Length: 235 ft (72 m)
- Propulsion: 600 hp (450 kW) steam engine
- Complement: 515
- Armament: 51 guns: 30 × 8 in; 1 × 68 pdr; 20 × 32 pdr

HMS Topaze was a 51-gun Liffey-class wooden screw frigate of the Royal Navy. She was launched on 12 May 1858, at Devonport Dockyard, Plymouth.

Her crew assisted in the building of the Race Rocks Lighthouse in British Columbia, Canada, and laid a bronze tablet in 1868 at the Juan Fernández Islands commemorating the stay of marooned sailor Alexander Selkirk. On the same voyage, the band from HMS Topaze played in Victoria, British Columbia for the dedication of Congregation Emanu-El, now the oldest surviving synagogue building in Canada.

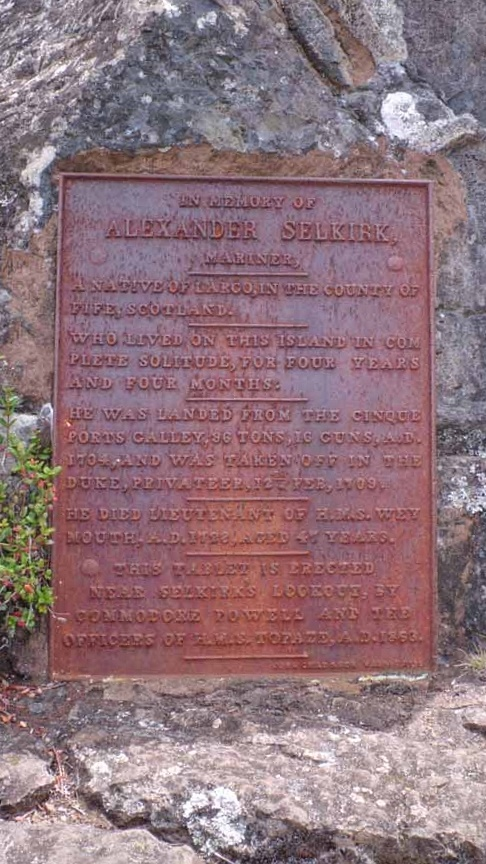
Selkirk tablet on Robinson Crusoe Island

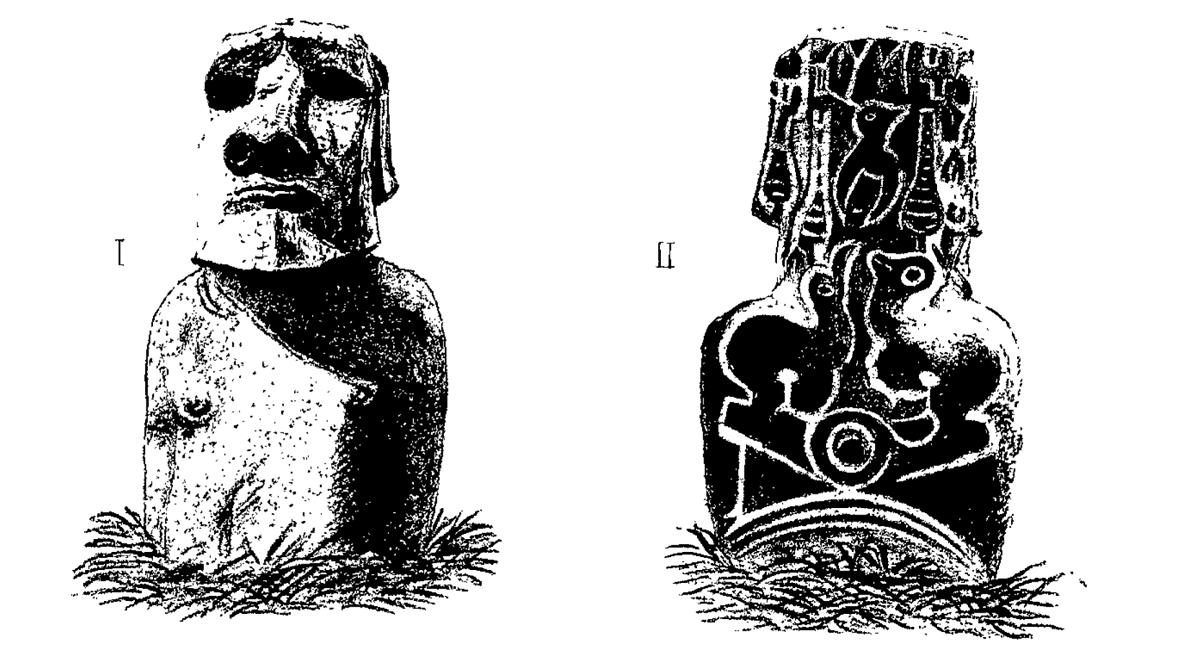
Sketches of Hoa Hakananai'a by Lt. Colin Dundas, when the moai was on board Topaze in 1868

In 1868 HMS Topaze voyaged to from Callao to Easter Island first sighting the island on 31 October before anchoring off Hanga Roa. The visit saw the crew remove the two moai Hoa Hakananai'a and Moai Hava and ship them to Britain. Hoa Hakananai'a was found in November 1868 by officers and crew from the Topaze. When first seen, it was buried up to about half its height or even more. It was dug out, dragged down on a sledge, and rafted out to the ship. HMS Topaze departed from the island at 5pm 7 November heading for Valparaíso.

Commodore Richard Ashmore Powell, captain of the Topaze, wrote to the British Admiralty offering the statues as a gift. Topaze arrived in Plymouth, England, on 16 August 1869. The Admiralty offered the moai to Queen Victoria, who proposed that they should be given to the British Museum.

The ship is notable for an incident when Agnes Weston came on board to plead the cause of Temperance; as she recalled in her memoir:

The Captain of H.M.S. Topaze invited me on board, and the men were mustered on the main deck; they listened very attentively. When I had finished speaking I asked the Captain, "Whether any men that wished it might join the Royal Naval Temperance Society?" He gave a cordial assent, and my eyes roved round to see on what place I could put the pledge-book. I saw what I thought to be a bread tub standing not far off. "Could I have that bread tub?" I asked; "it would make a nice little table turned over." I saw the Captain smile and tug at his moustache, and the men seemed on the brink of bursting into laughter. "Yes," he answered, "anything that we have is at your command. Here, men, a couple of hands roll over that grog-tub."

Topaze was sold on 14 February 1884 and broken up at Charlton.

== See also ==
- Relocation of moai
