= William Scoresby Routledge =

British anthropologist (1859–1939)

FRGS William Scoresby Routledge
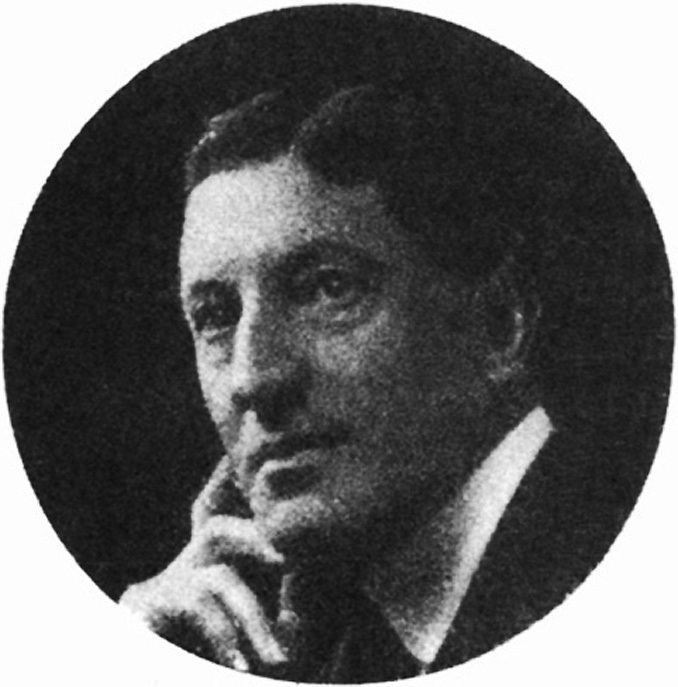
- Born: 1859
- Died: 1939 (aged 79–80)
- Education: Christ Church, Oxford; UCL Medical School
- Spouse: Katherine Routledge
- Scientific career
- Fields: Anthropology

William Scoresby Routledge (1859–1939) was a British ethnographer, anthropologist and adventurer. With his wife, Katherine Routledge, he completed the first ethnographies of the Kikuyu (East Africa) and the people of Rapa Nui (Easter Island).

== Early life ==
William was first child of William Routledge and Anne Sophia Twycross, who met and married in Melbourne, Australia. He was named after the British arctic explorer and whaler Dr. William Scoresby, a family friend. Scoresby spent his early years at "Vaucluse" in Richmond, Victoria, before returning to England in about 1867 with his parents and three younger sisters following the death of his father's brother and business partner. His family then lived at "Yarra-Yarra", at 3 Upperton Road, Eastbourne, Sussex.

William was the first cousin of British seismographer John Milne (1850–1913), who worked in Japan during the Meiji Restoration.

His paternal family had roots in Nova Scotia where his great-grandfather, Mr Justice Thomas Chandler Haliburton, was an MP, and author of an important history of the area: Historical and Statistical Account of Nova-Scotia. The two volumes were published by Howe in 1830.

== Education ==
In 1882, he took a BA from Christ Church. Oxford University. He then read medicine at University College Hospital, London. In 1883, he won the Physiology prize. He was also elected to the Royal Geographical Society, and in 1888 received the Erichsen prize for practical surgery. He did not complete his medical degree.

In later years he was elected to other clubs, namely the Royal Cruising Society of Antiquaries, the Geological Society, the Royal Anthropological Institute and as Fellow of the Royal Geographical Society (1900). The latter holds a collection of eight boxes of mostly unpublished field notes, sketches, maps, and photographs by the Routledges.

In 1906 Scoresby Routledge married a fellow Oxford graduate, Katherine Pease and a collaboration took place that lasted for 20 years producing a body of scholarly work that has for the most part stood the test of time.

As an ethnographer and anthropologist Scoresby Routledge spent his life visiting and documenting primitive cultures that were changing and disappearing in the early 20th century. The Routledges both did so with an urgency that indicated that they understood how quickly the history of these cultures would be lost forever as the stirrings of globalization started to take place when western ideas were introduced in formerly isolated areas (with access to remote areas of the earth by new roads or by sea routes being a major factor).

== The Mi'kmaq (Mic-macs) of Newfoundland ==
As an anthropologist he worked initially amongst the Mi'kmaq (Mic-macs) of Newfoundland. It was noted in The Times in 1915 that Scoresby Routledge was living with the Mi'kmaq in Central Newfoundland, where he learned hunting and woodcraft. Scoresby Routledge later described in the book he co-wrote with his wife Katherine on the Kikuyu, of travelling for four months on a beaver hunting expedition with the Mi'kmaq in densely forested country.

== The Kikuyu of East Africa ==
In 1902 Scoresby Routledge visited the Kikuyu tribe of Kenya, in the former British East Africa. He set up a fixed base camp at Fort Hall which was then a remote area located 60 mi (97 km) to the north east of Nairobi. The camp included a stone room for photographic work. Information regarding native customs was gathered as he rode about the country with members of the tribe and in the evening when everyone was welcome at the big fire in front of his tent. He gathered 36 artifacts on this trip which he presented to the British museum.

In 1906 on a trip to Naples to view the ruins of Pompeii, he met Oxford scholar Katherine Pease and they married shortly thereafter.

Katherine and Scoresby returned to Africa together for another two years and in 1910 jointly published a book entitled With a prehistoric people, the Akikuyu of British East Africa. The Routledges covered various aspects of the culture with chapters on social and political life (where Katherine focused on the position of women), dress, land and agriculture, flocks and herds, food and cookery and warfare. Arts and crafts such as methods of hut-building, fire-making, music and pottery-making were also recorded. Religion and folklore sections in the book recorded the beliefs of the Kikuyu about how they came to be who they were. Numerous photographs and illustrations made a permanent record of Kikuyu people and their customs. A few key members of the Kikuyu tribe were singled out as invaluable to their research. The Routledges collected Kikuyu artifacts including quivers, arrows and other weapons, pottery, tools and body ornaments, which were eventually donated to the British Museum and the Pitt Rivers Museum in Oxford.

Scoresby Routledge's perspective on their work in East Africa in the preface concluded with an observation that the study of the Kikuyu could offer the British an understanding and living reality of their Saxon ancestors, whose burial mounds were then being studied in England.

== Easter Island (Rapa Nui) ==
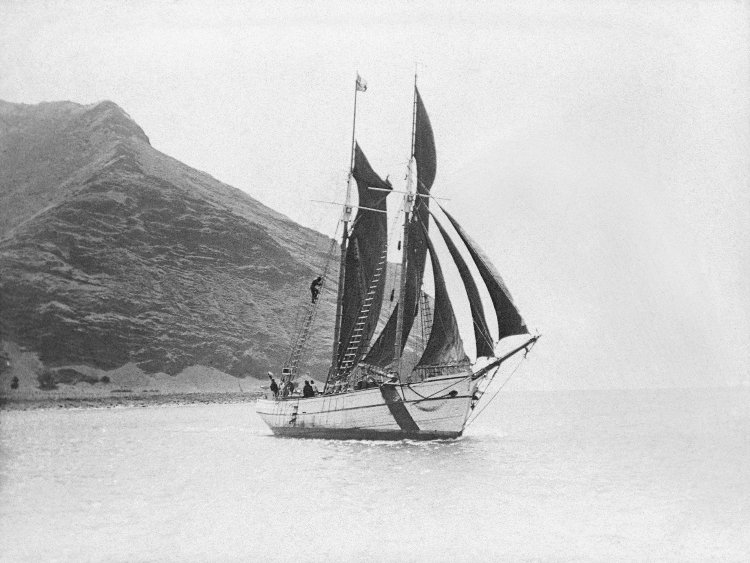
The Mana at Easter Island, 1914.

Following a suggestion from the British Museum, the Routledges set out on an expedition (1914–1915) to Easter Island in their yacht, Mana or "Great Spirit", a 90-foot Schooner. They sailed Falmouth, England, taking more than a year on a voyage that crossed half the globe. En route to the Pacific they passed through the Patagonia Passage in South America, collecting artifacts that are now held at the Pitt Rivers Museum. They arrived on Easter Island in 1914. The voyage of the Mana, which eventually covered 100,000 miles under sail, led to Scoresby Routledge being awarded the Challenge Cup of the Royal Cruising Club, which had not been awarded since 1876. At the time, there was growing public interest in the giant statues of the island, the moai, and so the British media followed their story. It was unknown in 1914 how the statues came to dominate the spare landscape of the isolated Pacific island which is 3,510 km (2,180 mi) west of Chile and a total area of 164 km (63 sq miles).

The Times of 1915 carried a report that described the Routledges returning to England from Easter Island in the Mana. The article mentioned there were 23 persons on board the yacht during its voyage. Scoresby and Katherine were the first qualified scholars to carry out an archeological survey of the island. The Routledges' timely visit to Easter Island preserved cultural and historic information that would otherwise have been lost. The material evidence of their expedition can be seen in the form of artifacts, papers, and photographic images.

== Polynesia ==
Katherine and Scoresby later travelled to Mangareva and East Polynesia in 1921–1923 but their work was never published as their relationship became strained. They had hoped to determine the origin of the Rapa Nui before missionaries arrived there and the information, legends and traditions were lost. An example of their work there is reflected in the vocabulary cards held by the Royal Geographical Society and the large model of an outrigger canoe from Mangareva that is on display on the first floor of the Pitt Rivers Museum.

== Jamaica ==
In 1920 Scoresby went on an expedition to cross the John Crow Mountains in Jamaica, as indicated by unpublished correspondence held by the Royal Geographical Society. In a brief account he gave to The Times newspaper on his return he described the difficulties of the perpetually moist limestone terrain, with narrow rock passages and lush vegetation impeding progress to the extent that the average rate of travel was .25 miles (0.40 km) per day. He also felt that but for the coincidence of a rare drought improving conditions, he would not have secured the assistance of local people. The expedition concluded before the drought ended on 20 April. Routledge crossed the range from the Rio Grande side to the east, accompanied by a party of Maroons and a sportsman visiting Jamaica, a Dr. Campbell.

== The final years ==
Scoresby and Katherine separated in Sydney, Australia, in 1923, although for several years they periodically lived together in both London and "Ewers", their home in Bursledon, Hampshire. They finally parted company in 1928 when Katherine's encroaching schizophrenia led to her being institutionalized; there was no issue.

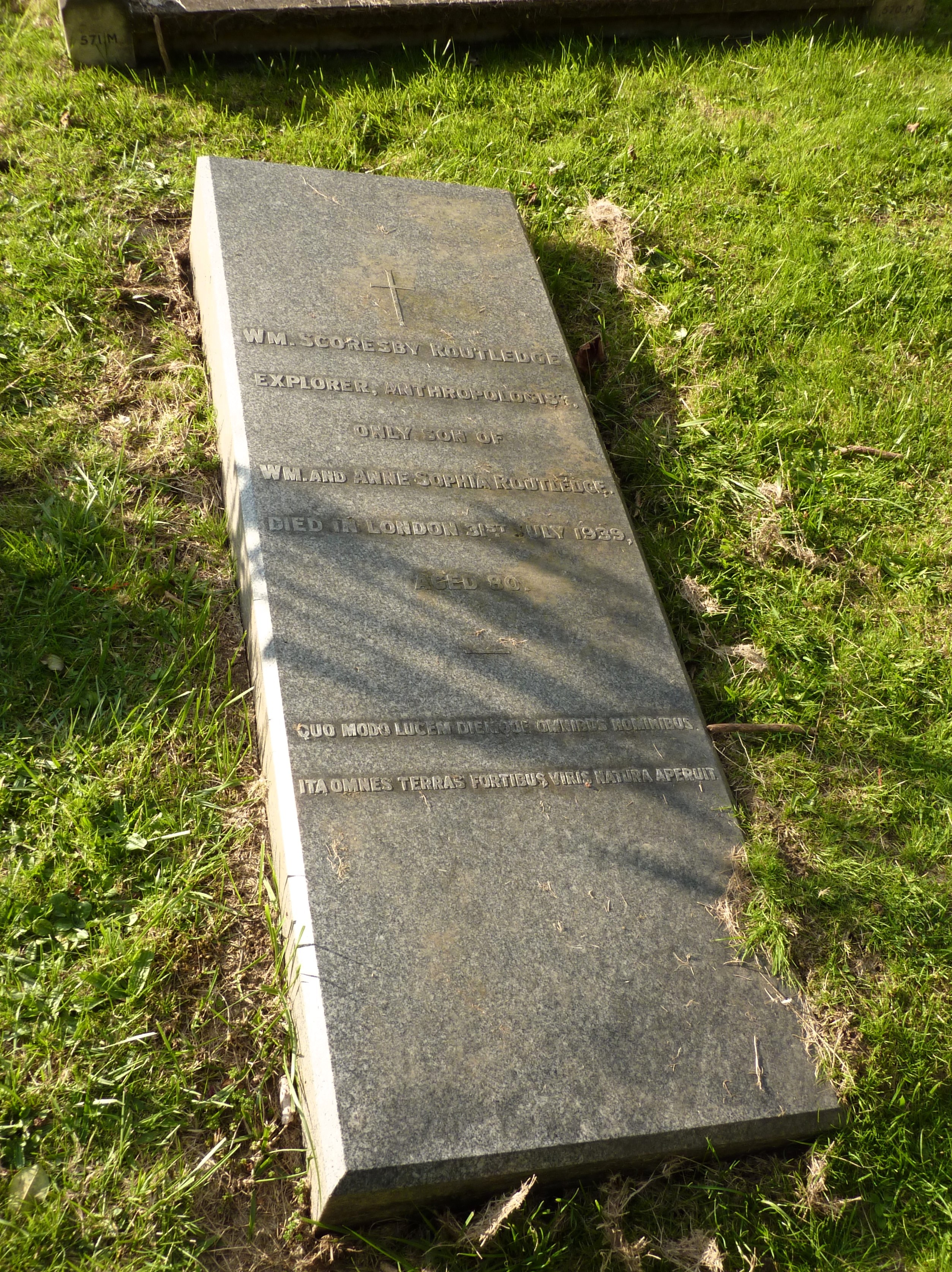
Scoresby's grave at Putney Vale Cemetery, London in 2014.

Scoresby preserved as much of Katherine's work as could be found by donating it to both the British Museum and the Pitt Rivers Museum in Oxford.

Scoresby spent his last days on the island of Cyprus, living in a villa at Tjiklos, Kyrenia. His papers were discovered by the daughter of a friend on the island and were also sent to join the large collection already held by the Royal Geographical Society.

Scoresby died in London where he is buried at Putney Vale Cemetery. The lettering on his gravestone reads: "Wm. Scoresby Routledge Explorer, Anthropologist, Only Son of Wm. and Anne Sophia Routledge Died in London, 31 July 1939, Aged 80 years". There is an added inscription on his grave in Latin, Quo Modo Lucem Diemque Omnibus Hominibus Ita Omnes Terras Fortibus Viris Natura Aperuit. This translates as 'Like light and day to all men, thus nature opens all lands to brave men'.

Another, final cache of the papers of William Scoresby Routledge and his wife Katherine Routledge devolved to his residual legatee in England, John Charles Dundas Harington, British judge and barrister. That large archive consisted of diaries, field notes, original illustrations, photographs, and artifacts, among other materials, relating to their expeditions in Kenya and Polynesia, among other places. The archive was sold and dispersed in a series of auctions between 2017 and 2021; a portion is now owned by The Jack Daulton Collection in California.

== Biographies ==
In 2003, American archaeologist Jo Anne Van Tilburg of UCLA, well known for her research on Rapa Nui, wrote the biography of Katherine Routledge Among Stone Giants: the Life of Katherine Routledge and Her Remarkable Expedition to Easter Island. Although the book was somewhat interpretive of Scoresby's character, it was based on fact, and a large amount of research.

Soon after another book was released written by Yale graduate Jennifer Vanderbes. In a comprehensive travel article written for the New York Times, A Faraway Land Steeped in Mystery in late 2003, she does not mention the Routledges. However her book, Easter Island, A Novel, shows more than a passing similarity to the story of the Routledges and Easter Island.

== Sources ==
- National Museum Australia William Scoresby Routledge collection
- John Milne: Seismologist.
- The Royal Cruising Club Journal
- Mike Pitts; The Crew of the Mana Do you have ancestors who went to Patagonia?
