= Jo Anne Van Tilburg =

American archaeologist

Jo Anne Van Tilburg is an American archaeologist best known for her research on the statues of Easter Island (Rapa Nui). Her primary specialty is rock art.

Van Tilburg was born in Minneapolis, Minnesota and graduated from the University of Minnesota in 1965, receiving her Ph.D. from the University of California at Los Angeles in 1986. She is currently Research Associate of The Cotsen Institute of Archaeology at UCLA and Director of the UCLA Rock Art Archive.

Van Tilburg directs "Captured Visions", an award-winning rock art recording project in the Great Basin. Other projets in which Van Tilburg is involved include the administration of a small grants program, training in field methods, and the creation of prototype digital storage projects for special collections.

Van Tilburg is also director of the Easter Island Statue Project. She has conducted seasonal fieldwork in the Pacific since 1982, including in the Republic of Palau and on Easter Island. She is considered one of the world's leading experts on Easter Island statues, and has worked closely with the Easter Island community to inventory, describe and catalog nearly 900 statues. She has produced a typological analysis and classification of the statue corpus that is a significant aid to chronological studies. She has conducted extensive archival and museum studies throughout the world and, since 1995, has researched the life of Edwardian archaeologist Katherine Routledge, the first woman (in company with her husband and fellow anthropologist William Scoresby Routledge), to conduct field work on Easter Island and in the Pacific. Van Tilburg wrote a biography of Routledge entitled Among Stone Giants: The Life of Katherine Routledge and Her Remarkable Expedition to Easter Island.

In 1998 she completed an experimental archaeology project to make and move a replica statue on Easter Island. A documentary film and web site were produced for Nova by WGBH Boston.

In 1989, Van Tilburg founded the Rapa Nui Outrigger Club (RNOC) as a sports club and integral part of Kahu Kahu O Hera, an association of artisans, elders and others on Easter Island. The stated purposes of the RNOC are to: "

- Provide an exciting and positive athletic experience for the Rapa Nui young people;
- Teach outrigger canoe paddling skills as a way to develop a healthy body, seek personal achievement, appreciate cooperative effort, and foster pride;
- Stimulate young people's interest in Rapa Nui prehistory;
- Encourage the understanding and appreciation of Rapa Nui's role in Polynesian seafaring history;
- Explore the natural environment of the Pacific Ocean and the ecology of Rapa Nui as part of that environment;
- Develop cultural exchanges with other Pacific islanders and continental peoples through the celebration of Rapa Nui maritime skills."

== Publications ==
- Van Tilburg, Jo Anne (1992). HMS Topaze on Easter Island: Hoa Hakananai'a and Five Other Museum Sculptures in Archaeological Context. Occasional Papers. Vol. 73. London: British Museum Press.
- Van Tilburg, Jo Anne (2003). Among Stone Giants: The Life of Katherine Routledge and Her Remarkable Expedition to Easter Island. New York: Scribner's. ISBN 0-7432-4480-X.
- Van Tilburg, Jo Anne (2004). Hoa Hakananai'a. Objects in Focus. London: British Museum Press. ISBN 978-0714150246.
- Van Tilburg, Jo Anne (2006). Remote Possibilities: Hoa Hakananai'a and HMS Topaze on Rapa Nui. British Museum Research Papers. Vol. 158. London: British Museum Press. ISBN 978-0861591589.
