= 2010 Easter Island moai referendum =

- 1 March 2010
- Do you agree with the temporary departure of the moai to France under the terms proposed by the Mare Nostrum Foundation?

Results
Choice	Votes	%
Yes	94	10.65%
No	789	89.35%
Valid votes	883	99.66%
Invalid or blank votes	3	0.34%
Total votes	886	100.00%
Registered voters/turnout	1,475	60.07%

A non-binding referendum on loaning a moai to France was held in Easter Island on 1 March 2010. Voters were asked whether they agreed with the Mare Nostrum Foundation displaying a moai in Paris, which had first been proposed in 2008. The loan was rejected by 89% of voters. As a result, on 14 April 2010 the Consejo de Monumentos Nacionales decided that the moai would not be sent to France.

== Results ==
Choice	Votes	%
For	94	10.65
Against	789	89.35
Total	883	100.00
Valid votes	883	99.66
Invalid/blank votes	3	0.34
Total votes	886	100.00
Registered voters/turnout	1,475	60.07
Source: Direct Democracy
