= 2013 World Yo-Yo Contest =

Floridian yo-yo competition

- Venue: Rozen Plaza Hotel
- Location: Orlando, Florida, United States
- Dates: August 8–10, 2013

The 2013 World Yo-Yo Contest (1st IYYF World Championship) was the culminating yo-yo competition of the worldwide competitive circuit. The winners from this competition in any of the six championship divisions were deemed the current World Yo-Yo Champion until the 2014 World Champions were crowned. The competition was run by Gregory Cohen with the International Yo-Yo Federation (IYYF). The competition took place at the Rozen Plaza Hotel in Orlando, Florida, USA from August 8–10, 2013.

== History ==
The first World Yo-Yo Contest was held in London, England, in 1932. The winner was Harvey Lowe. The contest was not held annually until 1992, when Dale Oliver started one in Montreal, Canada during that year's annual International Jugglers' Association's (IJA) convention. The contest was held during this convention until 1999, when it was held in Hawaii. The 2000 contest was held at Universal Studios in Orlando, but in 2001, the event moved to the Rosen Plaza Hotel, where it was held annually until 2013 by Gregory Cohen, owner and operator of YoYoGuy and Infinite Illusions. After the 2013 contest, an international coalition (the IYYF) was formed to organize a new, rotating contest which will be held in a different venue/country every year.

== Championship divisions ==
The World Yo-Yo Contest has 6 championship divisions that award the title of "World Yo-Yo Champion".

Division Name	Other Name	Explanation
1A	Single Hand String Trick	The player uses a long spinning yo-yo to perform tricks that typically require manipulation of the string.
2A	Two Hands Looping Trick	The player uses two yo-yos simultaneously to perform reciprocating or looping maneuvers.
3A	Two Hands String Trick	The player uses two long spinning yo-yos and performs tricks with both simultaneously.
4A	Offstring	The player uses an offstring yo-yo, often releasing the yo-yo into the air and attempting to catch it on the string.
5A	Counterweight	The player uses a yo-yo with a counterweight on the other end of the string rather than having it attached to a finger.
AP	Artistic Performance	The performer uses any type of yo-yo or other prop for an open-ended performance which emphasizes choreography and stage presence.

=== Championship division structure ===
There are a series of preliminary rounds before the final round at the World Yo-Yo Contest. Competitors were allowed a one-minute routine, and a set number of players would make the finals.

In the 1A division, there were three rounds of competition. In 2A-5A, there was only the Preliminary (1 minute) and the Final (3 minute). Only those who meet these requirements can enter the rounds.

- Preliminary (1 minute): Top 10 at a sanctioned National Competition/Multi-National Competition seeded directly to Preliminary, and top performing competitors from Wild-Card
- Semi-Final (1:30 minutes): Top-3 at sanctioned Multi-National Competition & sanctioned National Champions seeded directly to Semi-Final Top performing competitors from Preliminary
- Final (3 minutes): Previous Year's World Champion seeded directly to Final; Top performing competitors from Semi-Final; Sanctioned National Champions

== Champions ==
Style	Winner	2nd	3rd
1A	Janos Karancz (Hungary)	Christopher Chia (Singapore)	Luis Enrique-Villasenor (Mexico)
2A	Takuma Yamamoto (Japan)	Shu Takada (Japan)	Ryo Yamashita (Japan)
3A	Hank Freeman (USA)	Patrick Borgerding (USA)	Yasuki Tachibana (Japan)
4A	Michael Nakamura (USA)	Naoto Okada (Japan)	Chun Hin Chan (Hong Kong)
5A	Takeshi Matsuura (Japan)	Tyler Severance (USA)	Samm Scott (USA)
AP	SPIN NAT!ON (Japan)		

=== 1A ===
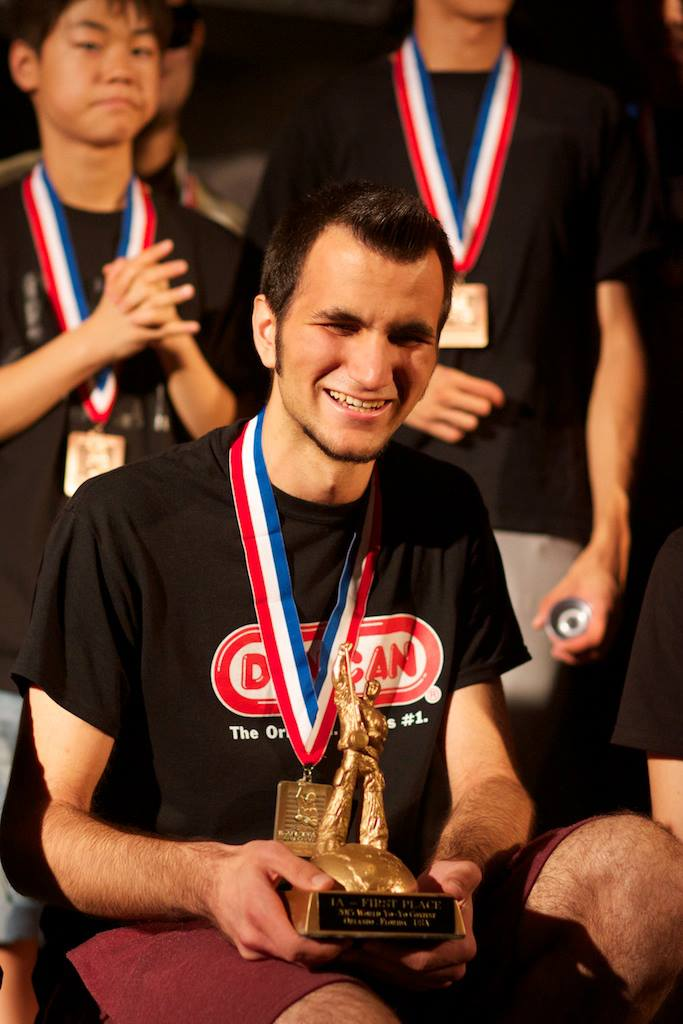
Janos Karancz winning World Title. He was the first European to win the 1A World Title.

Hungary's Janos Karancz became the first European to win the 1A division at the World Yo-Yo Contest. 2013 was also the first, and only, year to feature a top-3 in 1A with no players from Japan or the United States.

=== 2A ===
Following Shu Takada's 2012 World Title in the 2A division, 2013 was set up as a rematch between Takuma Yamamoto and Shu Takada. Yamamoto's secured his second World Title, his first in 2008. Japan, once again, swept the top three with Ryu Yamashita taking third.

=== 3A ===
Following a win at the 2012 US National Yo-Yo Competition, Patrick Borgerding came into the 3A finals. He challenged two-time defending champion Hank Freeman, but fell short. Hank Freeman completed a routine with only two minor mistakes—a record for the division—and secured his third consecutive World Title.

=== 4A ===
Every player had at least one major deduction. After defending champion Rei Iwakura got thirteen major deductions, Michael Nakamura to take the World Title. Chun Hin Chan became the first player outside of the United States or Japan to finish top-3 in the 4A division.

=== 5A ===
Takeshi Matsuura came in first place, earning his fifth world title in the 5A division. In second place was 2007 5A World Champion Tyler Severance, and in third place was 2011 5A US National Champion Samm Scott.

The judging system awarded Matsuura's tricks with a near-perfect score of 95.1, more than 20 points above the runner-up's score of 73.0.

=== AP ===
Japan's SP!N NATION won the AP division with a Cops and Robbers themed yo-yo skit.

== Participating nations ==
There are 33 countries currently registered with the IYYF that have the right to seed a National Champion into the semi-final round at the World Yo-Yo Contest. IYYF is also in communication with several other countries (denoted by *), but, currently, these countries do not have the right to seed a National Champion to the semi-finals.

=== Europe ===
- Czech Republic
- France
- Slovakia
- Spain
- Germany
- Italy
- Hungary
- Austria
- Greece
- Finland
- Poland
- Russia
- Israel
- Bulgaria
- United Kingdom
- Switzerland
- Turkey *
- Iceland *
- Denmark *
- Ireland *
- Norway *
- Netherlands *

=== North America ===
- United States
- Mexico
- Canada

=== Asia ===
- Japan
- Australia
- Brunei
- Korea
- Malaysia
- Hong Kong
- China
- Taiwan
- Thailand
- Vietnam
- Singapore
- Philippines
- Indonesia
- India *
- UAE *
- Pakistan *
- Bangladesh *
- Kazakhstan *

=== Africa ===
- South Africa *
- Morocco *

=== South America ===
- Brazil
- Chile *
- Venezuela *
- Colombia *

== See also ==
- List of yo-yo world champions
