= International Yo-Yo Federation =

Sporting organization

- Abbreviation: IYYF
- Formation: February 8, 2013
- Type: International non-governmental & non-profi organization
- Legal status: A legal entity operating in accordance with the laws of the Czech Republic
- Purpose: Developing and promoting yo-yoing as a sport on a global level.
- Headquarters: Czech Republic
- Location: Prague, Czech Republic
- Region served: Worldwide
- Members: National organization
- Official language: English
- Main organ: Executive Board
- Website: iyyf.org

International Yo-Yo Federation (IYYF) is an international Yo-yo organization that promotes World Yo-Yo Contest and European Yo-Yo Championship and develops and promotes yo-yoing as a sport on a global level.

== History ==
The International Yo-Yo Federation (IYYF) was formed on February 8, 2013. World Yo-Yo Contest had been promoted by Greg Cohen since 2000. IYYF was formed to promote world Yo-Yo contest and other international competitions. The United States, the Czech Republic, Japan, and Brazil are the first national members to join the IYYF.

== Executive board ==
- Ondrej Sedivy (Czech Yoyo Association)
- Hironori Mii (Japan Yo-Yo Federation)
- Rafael Matsunaga (Brazilian YoYo Association)
- Thad Winzenz (US National Yo-Yo League)
- Jan Kordovsky (Czech Yoyo Association)

== Styles ==
The 5 Divisions are 1A, 2A, 3A, 4A and 5A:

1. Single-handed String
2. Double-handed Looping
3. Double-handed String
4. Off-string
5. Counterweight

1A is the single unresponsive yoyo category, players are required to use only 1 unresponsive yoyo for their performance.

2A is the double responsive yoyo category, players are required to use 2 responsive yoyos for their performance. This is also known as the hardest yo-yoing style.

3A is the double unresponsive yoyo category, players are required to use 2 unresponsive yoyos for their performance.

4A is the off-string yoyo category, players are required to use a specially designed offstring yoyo for their performance, there are no limits to how many offstring yoyos you can use in the 4A category.

5A is the off-hand yoyo category, players are required to attach a special counter weight to a single unresponsive yoyo on the string for their performance.

== Events ==
- World Yo-Yo Contest
- European Yo-Yo Championship
- Asia Pacific Yo-Yo Championships
- Latin American Yo-Yo Contest
- U.S. National Yo-Yo Contest

== Winners ==
- List of yo-yo world champions

== Nations ==
Source:

== See also ==
- International Jugglers' Association
- World Juggling Federation
- International Sport Juggling Federation
- Sport juggling
- Sport stacking
