= European Yo-Yo Championship =

International yo-yo competition

- Venue: Theatre Archa
- Location: Prague, Czech
- Start date: January 30, 2010

The European Yo-Yo Championship (EYYC) is the European competition of yo-yo organized and sanctioned by the International Yo-Yo Federation (IYYF), and is one of 4 annual multi-national yo-yo competitions from which winners receive seeds to compete in the semi-finals of the annual World Yo-Yo Contest.

== Contests ==
EYYC has 5 European Title Divisions since 2010.

== Medals (2010-2019) ==
Only 1A, 2A, 3A, 4A, 5A Events.

Rank	Nation	Gold	Silver	Bronze	Total
1	Hungary (HUN)	12	10	8	30
2	Czech Republic (CZE)	11	9	7	27
3	Germany (GER)	8	0	2	10
4	Italy (ITA)	4	10	4	18
5	France (FRA)	4	2	4	10
6	Great Britain (GBR)	4	0	7	11
7	Israel (ISR)	3	2	0	5
8	Poland (POL)	2	3	4	9
9	Switzerland (SUI)	1	5	4	10
10	Slovakia (SVK)	1	1	3	5
11	Iceland (ISL)	0	4	1	5
12	Bulgaria (BUL)	0	2	3	5
13	Russia (RUS)	0	2	2	4
14	Finland (FIN)	0	0	1	1
Totals (14 entries)		50	50	50	150

== Participating nations ==
Participating nations are mainly, but not limited to nations situated in the continent of Europe. Exceptions have been made for some non-European countries in West Asia such as Armenia in West Asia and past Republics of the Soviet Union, and most recently Israel. These countries are permitted to compete at the discretion of the International Yo-Yo Federation (IYYF), either due to their geographical distance from their respective multi-national competitions, or due to the lack of a multi-national competition in their respective continent.

The following list shows countries which are permitted to participate as of EYYC 2015.

=== West Europe ===
- Austria
- Belgium
- England
- Germany
- Ireland
- Liechtenstein
- Luxembourg
- Netherlands
- Northern Ireland
- Principality of Sealand
- Scotland
- Switzerland
- United Kingdom
- Wales

=== East Europe ===
- Abkhazia
- Armenia
- Azerbaijan
- Belarus
- Bulgaria
- Croatia
- Czech Republic
- Estonia
- Poland
- Georgia
- Hungary
- Latvia
- Lithuania
- Romania
- Russia
- Serbia
- Slovakia
- Slovenia
- South Ossetia
- Ukraine

=== North Europe ===
- Denmark
- Finland
- Norway
- Sweden
- Iceland

=== South Europe ===
- Albania
- Andorra
- Bosnia and Herzegovina
- Cyprus
- Greece
- Italy
- Kosovo
- North Macedonia
- Malta
- Moldova
- Monaco
- Montenegro
- Northern Cyprus
- Portugal
- San Marino
- Spain
- Turkey
- Vatican City

=== Other ===
- Israel

== List of champions ==
=== Championships ===
==== 1A ====
Year	Winner	2nd	3rd
2010	Vashek Kroutil (Czech Republic)	Mateusz Ganc (Poland)	Lorenzo Sabatini (Italy)
2011	Tomáš Bubák (Czech Republic)	Mateusz Ganc (Poland)	Grzegorz Wojcik (Poland)
2012	Grzegorz Wójcik (Poland)	Vashek Kroutil (Czech Republic)	Mateusz Ganc (Poland)
2013	Janos Karancz (Hungary)	Gregorz Wójcik (Poland)	Maxim Gruzintsev (Russia)
2014	Carlos Braun (Germany)	Jan Hlinka (Slovakia)	Vilmos Zoltan Kiss (Hungary)
2015	Jakub Dekan (Czech Republic)	Tal Mordoch (Israel)	Vilmos Zoltan Kiss (Hungary)
2016	Tal Mordoch (Israel)	Konstantin Tudjarov (Bulgaria)	Jakub Dekan (Czech Republic)
2017	Tal Mordoch (Israel)	Konstantin Tudjarov (Bulgaria)	Janos Karancz (Hungary)
2018	Tal Mordoch (Israel)	Michael Malík (Czech Republic)	Kacper Pałatyński (Poland)
2019	Kacper Pałatyński (Poland)	Tal Mordoch (Israel)	Michael Malík (Czech Republic)
2022	Jakub Dolejš (Czech Republic)	Michael Malík (Czech Republic)	Matouš Tomeš (Czech Republic)

==== 2A ====
Year	Winner	2nd	3rd
2010	Dave Geigle (Germany)	Jan Schmutz (Switzerland)	Ivo Studer (Switzerland)
2011	Dave Geigle (Germany)	Jan Schmutz (Switzerland)	Ivo Studer (Switzerland)
2012	Dave Geigle (Germany)	Jan Schmutz (Switzerland)	Luke Roberts (United Kingdom)
2013	Dave Geigle (Germany)	Jan Schmutz (Switzerland)	Jan Bubák (Czech Republic)
2014	Dave Geigle (Germany)	Matyáš Racek (Czech Republic)	Dominique Vionnet (Switzerland)
2015	Jan Schmutz (Switzerland)	Matyáš Racek (Czech Republic)	Clément Bertaux (France)
2016	Naoto Okada (Germany)	Jan Schmutz (Switzerland)	Matyáš Racek (Czech Republic)
2017	Clément Bertaux (France)	Matyáš Racek (Czech Republic)	Andres "PAC" Pegam (Germany)
2018	Matyáš Racek (Czech Republic)	Quentin Godet (France)	George Stoyanov (Bulgaria)
2019	Huy Chan Chun (United Kingdom)	Matyáš Racek (Czech Republic)	Márk Németh (Hungary)

==== 3A ====
Year	Winner	2nd	3rd
2010	Lorenzo Sabatini (Italy)	Ondřej Šedivý (Czech Republic)	Liam Devine (United Kingdom)
2011	David Molnár (Hungary)	Lorenzo Sabatini (Italy)	Saska Särkilahti (Finland)
2012	Michal Jaško (Czech Republic)	Lorenzo Sabatini (Italy)	Stephen Langley (United Kingdom)
2013	Michal Jaško (Czech Republic)	Lorenzo Sabatini (Italy)	Stephen Langley (United Kingdom)
2014	Michal Jaško (Czech Republic)	Stephan Kosintev (Russia)	Stephen Langley (United Kingdom)
2015	Stephen Langley (United Kingdom)	Páll Valdimar Guðmundsson Kolka (Iceland)	Lorenzo Sabatini (Italy)
2016	Stephen Langley (United Kingdom)	Lorenzo Sabatini (Italy)	Pall Valdimar Gudmundsson (Iceland)
2017	Stephen Langley (United Kingdom)	Páll Valdimar Guðmundsson Kolka (Iceland)	Seva Golovin (Czech Republic)
2018	Takuma Inoue (Hungary)	Páll Valdimar Guðmundsson Kolka (Iceland)	Lorenzo Sabatini (Italy)
2019	Lorenzo Sabatini (Italy)	Páll Valdimar Guðmundsson Kolka (Iceland)	Stephen Langley (United Kingdom)

==== 4A ====
Year	Winner	2nd	3rd
2010	Nandor Groger (Hungary)	Lorenzo Sabatini (Italy)	Luke Roberts (United Kingdom)
2011	Nandor Groger (Hungary)	Lorenzo Sabatini (Italy)	Hybl Zdenek (Czech Republic)
2012	Lorenzo Sabatini (Italy)	Groger Nandor (Hungary)	Molnar David (Hungary)
2013	Lorenzo Sabatini (Italy)	Molnar David (Hungary)	Quentin Godet (France)
2014	Quentin Godet (France)	Lorenzo Sabatini (Italy)	Groger Nandor (Hungary)
2015	Quentin Godet (France)	Lorenzo Sabatini (Italy)	Jeff Coons (Germany)
2016	Naoto Okada (Germany)	Norbert Jenei (Hungary)	Quentin Godet (France)
2017	Quentin Godet (France)	Lorenzo Sabatini (Italy)	Norbert Jenei (Hungary)
2018	František Procházka (Czech Republic)	Lorenzo Sabatini (Italy)	Quentin Godet (France)
2019	František Procházka (Czech Republic)	Quentin Godet (France)	Lorenzo Sabatini (Italy)

==== 5A ====
Year	Winner	2nd	3rd
2010	Petr Kavka (Czech Republic)	David Molnar (Hungary)	Peter Kison (Slovakia)
2011	David Molnar (Hungary)	Alexey Nemchik (Russia)	Peter Kison (Slovakia)
2012	Daniel Budai (Hungary)	David Molnar (Hungary)	Alexey Nemchik (Russia)
2013	Ján Hlinka (Slovakia)	Daniel Budai (Hungary)	Maciek Cwynar (Poland)
2014	David Molnar (Hungary)	Daniel Budai (Hungary)	Petr Kavka (Czech Republic)
2015	David Molnar (Hungary)	Daniel Budai (Hungary)	Petr Kavka (Czech Republic)
2016	David Molnar (Hungary)	Petr Kavka (Czech Republic)	Nicolas Záhorský (Slovakia)
2017	Viktor Kollár (Hungary)	Petr Kavka (Czech Republic)	George Stoyanov (Bulgaria)
2018	Takuma Inoue (Hungary)	Viktor Kollár (Hungary)	George Stoyanov (Bulgaria)
2019	Petr Kavka (Czech Republic)	Viktor Kollár (Hungary)	Gábor Szilágyi (Hungary)

==== AP ====
Year	Winner		2nd		3rd	
2012	inmot!on	Ivo Studer (Switzerland)	Yoyo Elite	Berkay Güleç (Turkey)	InTeam!	Joe Greve (Germany)
2012	inmot!on	Jan Schmutz (Switzerland)	Yoyo Elite	Ege Demir (Turkey)	InTeam!	Markus Wagner (Germany)
2012	inmot!on	–	Yoyo Elite	Eren Ataş (Turkey)	InTeam!	–
2012	inmot!on	–	Yoyo Elite	Gökten Uzuner (Turkey)	InTeam!	–
2012	inmot!on	–	Yoyo Elite	Ömer Çelebi (Turkey)	InTeam!	–
2012	inmot!on	–	Yoyo Elite	Rüçhan Akyüz (Turkey)	InTeam!	–
2013	inmot!on	Ivo Studer (Switzerland)	Burnin Berlin	Andres Pegam (Germany)	Wolwes	Farkas-Holpert Péter (Hungary)
2013	inmot!on	Jan Schmutz (Switzerland)	Burnin Berlin	Dinh Bao Dang (Germany)	Wolwes	Farkas Bálint (Hungary)
2013	inmot!on	–	Burnin Berlin	Jakub Kendzierski (Poland)	Wolwes	–
2013	inmot!on	–	Burnin Berlin	Marc Freudenreich (Germany)	Wolwes	–
2013	inmot!on	–	Burnin Berlin	Paul Klatt (Germany)	Wolwes	–
2014	Sleeperz	Robert Kučera (Czech Republic)	Burnin Berlin	Andres Pegam (Germany)	–	No 3rd Place
2014	Sleeperz	Zdeněk Hýbl (Czech Republic)	Burnin Berlin	Dinh Bao Dang (Germany)	–	–
2014	Sleeperz	–	Burnin Berlin	Jakub Kendzierski (Poland)	–	–
2014	Sleeperz	–	Burnin Berlin	Tina Assmann (Germany)	–	–
2014	Sleeperz	–	Burnin Berlin	Gesine Lent (Germany)	–	–
2015	inmot!on	Ivo Studer (Switzerland)	Yoyoboys	Robert Kučera (Czech Republic)	–	No 3rd Place
2015	inmot!on	Jan Schmutz (Switzerland)	Yoyoboys	Zdeněk Hýbl (Czech Republic)	–	–

==== Spin Top ====
Year	Winner	2nd	3rd
2010	Jan Dvorak (Czech Republic)	Jakub Konečný (Czech Republic)	Daniel Konečný (Czech Republic)
2011	Jakub Konečný (Czech Republic)	Daniel Konečný (Czech Republic)	Jan Dvořák (Czech Republic)
2012	Jakub Konečný (Czech Republic)	Tyler Young (United States)	Lorenzo Sabatini (Italy)
2013	Daniel Konečný (Czech Republic)	Jakub Konečný (Czech Republic)	Tyler Young (United States)
2014	Daniel Konečný (Czech Republic)	Tyler Young (United States)	Jakub Konečný (Czech Republic)
2015	Jakub Konečný (Czech Republic)	Jan Kloubec (Czech Republic)	Daniel Konečný (Czech Republic)
2016	Daniel Konečný (Czech Republic)	Jakub Konečný (Czech Republic)	Taka Hasegawa (Japan)

=== Non Championship Divisions ===
==== Open 1A ====
Year	Winner	2nd	3rd
2010	Sebastian Brock (United States)	Jason Lee (United States)	Ryan Dembiec (United States)
2011	Kōta Watanabe (Japan)	Kengo Kido (Japan)	Kentarō Kimura (Japan)
2012	Peter Pong-Si Yee (Hong Kong)	Augie Fash (United States)	Paul Han (United States)
2013	Kōta Watanabe (Japan)	Tyler Severance (United States)	Ricardo Marechal (Brazil)
2014	Paul Kerbel (Mexico)	Marcus Koh (Singapore)	Iori Yamaki (Japan)
2015	Ryōsuke Iwasawa (Japan)	Simpson Wong Sheuk (Hong Kong)	Rodrigo Yokota (Brazil)
2016	Gentry Stein (United States)	Paolo Bueno (Brazil)	Izuru Hasumi (Japan)
2017	Evan Nagao (United States)	Andrew Maider (United States)	Colin Beckford (United States)
2018	Yulin "Luckey" Li (China)	Ye Tong (China)	Ryōtarō Miura (Japan)
2019	Keiran Cooper (United States)	Daniel Flaherty (United States)	Remy Baskin (United States)

==== 1A Junior ====
Year	Winner	2nd	3rd
2015	Kacper Pałatyński (Poland)	Matyáš Hronek (Czech Republic)	Ernest Wróbel (Poland)
2016	Sebastian Holzkamp (Germany)	Lukáš Pánek (Czech Republic)	Alessandro Pulesel (Czech Republic)
2017	Dan Boura	Jakub Dolejš	Kuba Velek

==== Trick Ladder ====
Year	Winner	2nd	3rd
2010	?	?	?
2011	Dan Souček (Czech Republic)	?	?
2012	?	?	?
2013	?	?	?
2014	Matěj Bělousov (Slovakia)	?	?
2015	Veronika Kamenská (Czech Republic)	?	?

==== 1A Women’s freestyle ====
Year	Winner	2nd	3rd
2012	Corli du Toit (United Kingdom)	Ann Connolly (United States)	Julia Gutowska (Poland)
2013	Julia Aleksandra Gutowska (Poland)	Ann Connolly (United States)	Ekaterina L'gotina (Russia)
2014	Jaslyn Shi (Singapore)	Corli du Toit (United Kingdom)	Josefina Nešporová (Czech Republic)
2015	Julia Aleksandra Gutowska (Poland)	Veronika Kamenská (Czech Republic)	Małgorzata Derkacz (Poland)
2016	Tessa Piccillo (United States)	Veronika Kamenská (Czech Republic)	Ann Connolly (Czech Republic)
2017	Veronika Kamenská (Czech Republic)	Karolína Záhrubská (Czech Republic)	Corli de Toit (South Africa)
2018	Veronika Kamenská (Czech Republic)	Dominika Stanisławska (Poland)	Karolína Záhrubská (Czech Republic)
2019	Veronika Kamenská (Czech Republic)	Dominika Stanisławska (Poland)	Kori Mirtse (Hungary)

== See also ==
- World Yo-Yo Contest
- Latin American Yo-Yo Contest
- U.S. National Yo-Yo Contest
- International Yo-Yo Federation
