= Tessa Piccillo =

American professional yo-yoer

- Occupation: Yo-yo performer

Tessa Piccillo is an American professional yo-yoer. She is a yo-yo world champion and has been called one of the biggest names in the yo-yo circuit. Piccillo won the Women’s Division at the World Yo-Yo Contest in 2014 and 2017, and second place in 2016. Piccillo won the 1A Women’s Freestyle division at the European Yo-Yo Championship in 2016. Piccillo is from San Francisco, California.
