= Gentry Stein =

American yo-yo world champion

- Born: Chico, California, U.S.
- Occupation: Yo-yo performer
- Known for: 2014 & 2019 1A World Yo-Yo Champion; 2013, 2015, 2016 & 2019 1A Former U.S. National Yo-Yo Champion

Gentry Stein is a yo-yo world champion. Stein won the 1A Division of the World Yo-Yo Contest in 2014 and 2019, and received third place in 2011 and 2017. Stein won the 1A division title of the U.S. National Yo-Yo Contest in 2013, 2015, 2016 and 2019. Stein won the Open 1A division at the European Yo-Yo Championship in 2016. Stein is from Chico, California.

Stein is one of only 5 yo-yoers to ever get more than one world title in the 1A division.

== Competitive career ==
Gentry Stein Competition Results
	2009	2010	2011	2012	2013	2014	2015	2016	2017	2018	2019	
World Yo-Yo Contest			3rd	6th	29th(P)	1st	6th	4th	3rd	7th	1st	
National Yo-Yo Contest		4th	3rd	2nd	1st	2nd	1st	1st	2nd	2nd	1st	Judge
EYYC Open								1st				
Bay Area Classic	15th	4th	1st		1st							
Pacific Northwest Regional		2nd	1st	1st				4th				
California State Yo-Yo Contest		4th	2nd		1st	10th	1st	1st				
Las Vegas Yo-Yo Open							1st					

== See also ==
- List of yo-yo world champions
