= United States National Championships =

United States National Championships may refer to:

- Badminton: U.S. National Badminton Championships
- Curling: United States Men's Curling Championship,
  United States Women's Curling Championship
- Cycling: United States National Road Race Championships,
  United States National Cyclo-cross Championships,
  United States National Mountain Bike Championships
- Dance: United States Dance Championships
- Figure Skating: U. S. Figure Skating Championships
- Gymnastics: USA Gymnastics National Championships
- Skiing: U.S. National Ski Jumping Championships,
  United States Nordic Combined Championships,
  United States Alpine Ski Championships
- Soccer (Association football): U.S. Open Cup
- Swimming: United States Swimming National Championships
- Tennis: US Open (tennis),
  U.S. National Indoor Championships
- Track & Field: USA Outdoor Track and Field Championships
- Yo-Yo: U.S. National Yo-Yo Contest
