= List of yo-yo world champions =

List of World Yo-Yo Champions is the list of the competitors who won the World Yo-Yo Contest. This list includes non-championship divisions.

== Governing bodies ==
Year(s)	Event name	Governing body	Note
1932	World Yo-Yo Championship		Reportedly held in England, United Kingdom.
1992–1995	Yo-Yo Championships	International Jugglers' Association	Organized by Dale Oliver under the auspices of the IJA and held during the annual IJA convention.
1996–1997	World Yo-Yo Championships	International Jugglers' Association	Organized by Dale Oliver under the auspices of the IJA and held during the annual IJA convention.
1998	World Yo-Yo Championships	HPK Marketing	Organized by Alan Nagao, head of HPK Marketing and owner of hobby shop High Performance Kites. The events were held in conjunction with Bandai and during the height of the yo-yo boom.
1999	World Yo-Yo Competition	HPK Marketing	Organized by Alan Nagao, head of HPK Marketing and owner of hobby shop High Performance Kites. The events were held in conjunction with Bandai and during the height of the yo-yo boom.
2000–2012	World Yo-Yo Contest		Organized by Greg Cohen, owner of hobby shop Infinite Illusions and confectionary Lofty Pursuits.
2013–	World Yo-Yo Contest	International Yo-Yo Federation	Headed by Steve Brown. Event venues rotate between Asia, Europe and the Americas.

== Primary solo divisions ==
=== Current ===
==== 1A ====
Was known as A or "Single A" from 1998 to 2004.

Historical world championships
Year	Category	Winner	2nd	3rd	Ref.
1932		(Canada) Harvey Lowe	(Canada) Joe Young		
International Jugglers' Association
1992		(United States) Dale Oliver	(United States) Dale Myrberg	(United States) Jennifer Baybrook	
1993	Senior	(United States) Rocco Ysaguirre	(United States) Jon Gates	(United States) Mark Hayward	
1993	Amateur	(United States) Tom Gates	(Japan) Masahiro Mizuno	(United States) Eric Cohen	
1994	Pro-Am	(United States) Bill de Boisblanc	(United States) Jon Gates	(United States) Tom McCoy	
1994	Senior (16 and older)	(United States) Mike Taylor Jr.	(United States) Bonnie Matthews	(United States) Josh Kavanagh	
1994	Junior (12 to 15)	(United States) Brett Burkhart	(United States) Thai Nguyen	(United States) Liubo Yepez	
1994	Novice (11 and under)	(United States) Chris Gryndle	(United States) Joe Hout	(United States) Marshall Wharam	
1995	Pro-Am	(United States) Bill de Boisblanc	(United States) Dale Myrberg	(United States) Mike Tayler	
1995	Masters	(United States) Mark Hayward	(United States) Ron Spears	(Japan) Masahiro Mizuno	
1995	Senior	(United States) Stuart Crump	(United States) Michael Harris	(United States) Mike Taylor	
1995	Junior (12 to 15)	(United States) Jacob Hall	(United States) Jason Tracey	(United States) Tuan Nguyen	
1995	Novice (11 and under)	(United States) Brett Jurgens	(United States) Steve Crump	(United States) Joe Hout	
1996	Pro-Am	(United States) Dale Myrberg	(United States) Bill de Boisblanc	(United States) Mike Tayler	
1996	Masters	(United States) 'Dazzling' Dave Schulte	(United States) Jason Tracy	(Japan) Masahiro Mizuno	
1996	Senior	(United States) Jon Steinman	(United States) David Harris	(United States) Greg Cohen	
1996	Junior (12 to 15)	(United States) Brett Jurgens	(United States) Joe Hout		
1996	Novice (11 and under)	(United States) Mikey McCabe	(Australia) Wayne	(Fiji) Abi Maharaj	
1997	Pro-Am	(United States) Bill de Boisblanc	(United States) Alex Garcia	(United States) Jennifer Baybrook	
1997	Masters	(United States) Nalukai Hookano	(United States) Yves Young	(United States) Steve Brown	

Modern world championships
Year	Winner	2nd	3rd	4th	Ref.
MPK Marketing
1998	(Japan) Ryoichi Suzuki	(United States) Ross Pascual	(Japan) Masashi Ishiwatari	(United States) Steve Brown	
1999	(United States) Joel Zink	(Japan) Hironori Mii	(Japan) Keijiro Hasegawa	(Japan) Keiichi Kura	
World Yo-Yo Contest
2000	(Japan) Yu Kawada	(Japan) Hidemasa Semba	(United States) Matthew Rose	(United States) Chris Vedral	
2001	(Japan) Tomonari 'Black' Ishiguro	(Japan) Kota Watanabe	(Germany) Dennis Schleussner	(Japan) Hidemasa Semba	
2002	(United States) Yuuki Spencer	(Japan) Hiroyuki Suzuki	(Japan) Tomonari 'Black' Ishiguro	(United States) Eric Hesterman	
2003	(United States) Johnnie DelValle	(United States) Brent Dellinger	(Japan) Hiroyuki Suzuki	(United States) Yuuki Spencer	
2004	(Japan) Hiroyuki Suzuki	(Japan) Tomonari 'Black' Ishiguro	(United States) Yuuki Spencer	(United States) Justin Weber	
2005	(Japan) Hiroyuki Suzuki	(United States) Yuuki Spencer	(Japan) Takayasu Tanaka	(United States) Mark Montgomery	
2006	(Japan) Hiroyuki Suzuki	(United States) Paul Han	(United States) Eric Koloski	(Japan) Takayasu Tanaka	
2007	(United States) Yuuki Spencer	(Japan) Hiroyuki Suzuki	(United States) Paul Han	(United States) Eric Koloski	
2008	(United States) John Ando	(Japan) Hiroyuki Suzuki	(United States) Sebastian Brock	(China) Luo Yi Cheng	
2009	(Japan) Shinya Kido	(Japan) Hiroyuki Suzuki	(United States) Chris Fraser	(Canada) Jensen Kimmt	
2010	(Canada) Jensen Kimmitt	(Japan) Hiroyuki Suzuki	(Singapore) Christopher Chia	(United States) Yuuki Spencer	
2011	(Singapore) Jin-Hao 'Marcus' Koh	(United States) Sebastian Brock	(United States) Gentry Stein	(Japan) Hiroyuki Suzuki	
2012	(Japan) Hiroyuki Suzuki	(Singapore) Jin-Hao 'Marcus' Koh	(Singapore) Christopher Chia	(United States) Harold Owens III	
International Yo-Yo Federation
2013	(Hungary) János Karancz	(Singapore) Christopher Chia	(Mexico) Luis Enrique Villasenor	(United States) Eric Tran-Ton	
2014	(United States) Gentry Stein	(Japan) Takeshi Matsuura	(Japan) Iori Yamaki	(Mexico) Paul Kerbel	
2015	(United States) Zach Gormley	(Japan) Shion Araya	(Japan) Iori Yamaki	(Japan) Takeshi Matsuura	
2016	(Japan) Shion Araya	(Japan) Yamato Murata	(United States) Zach Gormley	(United States) Gentry Stein	
2017	(Japan) Shion Araya	(United States) Andrew Bergen	(United States) Gentry Stein	(Japan) Yamato Murata	
2018	(United States) Evan Nagao	(Japan) Takeshi Matsuura	(Japan) Yuki Nishisako	(Japan) Shion Araya	
2019	(United States) Gentry Stein	(United States) Evan Nagao	(Japan) Yuki Nishisako	(United States) Nathan Dailey	
2023	(South Korea) Mir Kim	(Japan) Ryuichi Nakamura	(United States) Evan Nagao	(United States) Connor Seals	
2024	(South Korea) Mir Kim	(Czech Republic) Jakub Dolejš	(United States) Hunter Feuerstein	(South Korea) Jae Hwi Seung	
2025	(South Korea) Mir Kim	(United States) Hunter Feuerstein	(United States) Chandler Steele	(Czech Republic) Jakub Dolejš	
2026	(South Korea) Mir Kim	(Czech Republic) Jakub Dolejš	(United States) Hunter Feuerstein	(United States) Thomas Rajan	

==== 2A ====
Was known as AA or "Double A" from 1998 to 2004.

Year	Winner	2nd	3rd	4th	Ref.
MPK Marketing
1998	(United States) Jennifer Baybrook	(Japan) Takumi Nagase	(United States) Alan Batangan	(United States) Alex Garcia	
1999	(Japan) Takumi Nagase	(Japan) Koji Yokoyama	(Japan) Masaya Shimazaki	(United States) Paul Han	
World Yo-Yo Contest
2000	(Japan) Tomoya Kitamura	(Japan) Koji Yokoyama	(Japan) Masahiro Tanikawa	(Japan) Taichi Takagi	
2001	(United States) Matt Harlow	(Japan) Koji Yokoyama	(United States) John 'JM' McNulty	(Japan) Kenichiro Tada	
2002	(Japan) Shinji Saito	(Japan) Yukihiro Suzuki	(Japan) Koji Yokoyama	(United States) Matt Harlow	
2003	(Japan) Shinji Saito	(Japan) Koji Yokoyama	(Japan) Yukihiro Suzuki	(Japan) Masahiro Tanikawa	
2004	(Japan) Shinji Saito	(Japan) Koji Yokayama (tie)	(Japan) Ryusei Saito	(United States) John Ando	
2004	(Japan) Shinji Saito	(Japan) Hiraku Fujii (tie)	(Japan) Ryusei Saito	(United States) John Ando	
2005	(Japan) Shinji Saito	(Japan) Koji Yokoyama	(United States) Patrick Mitchell	(Japan) Junya Yamamoto	
2006	(Japan) Shinji Saito	(Japan) Koji Yokoyama	(United States) John Ando	(Japan) Kiwamu Ebata	
2007	(Japan) Shinji Saito	(Japan) Koji Yokoyama	(Japan) Ryusei Saito	(Japan) Shuhei Kanai	
2008	(Japan) Takuma Yamamoto	(Japan) Shinji Saito	(Japan) Hiraku Fujii	(Japan) Jun Taniguchi	
2009	(Japan) Shinji Saito	(Japan) Yasushi Furukawa	(Japan) Hiraku Fujii	(Japan) Ryo Yamashita	
2010	(Japan) Yasushi Furukawa	(Japan) Ryo Yamashita	(Japan) Shu Takada	(Japan) Masakazu Yamasaki	
2011	(Japan) Shinji Saito	(Japan) Yasushi Furukawa	(Japan) Ryo Yamashita	(Japan) Takuma Yamamoto	
2012	(Japan) Shu Takada	(Japan) Takuma Yamamoto	(Japan) Hiraku Fujii	(Japan) Joseph Harris	
International Yo-Yo Federation
2013	(Japan) Takuma Yamamoto	(Japan) Shu Takada	(Japan) Ryo Yamashita	(Hong Kong) Chun Hay Chan	
2014	(Japan) Takuma Yamamoto	(Japan) Yasushi Furukawa	(Japan) Hiraku Fujii	(Japan) Tomoyuki Kaneko	
2015	(Japan) Shinji Saito	(Japan) Shu Takada	(Japan) Takuma Yamamoto	(Japan) Tomoyuki Kaneko	
2016	(Japan) Shu Takada	(Japan) Hiraku Fujii	(Japan) Takuma Yamamoto	(Japan) Shuhei Kanai	
2017	(Japan) Shu Takada	(Japan) Hiraku Fujii	(Japan) Takuma Yamamoto	(China) Chenghao Yi	
2018	(Japan) Shu Takada	(Japan) Takuma Yamamoto	(Japan) Hiraku Fujii	(Hong Kong) Man Ki Liu	
2019	(Japan) Takuma Yamamoto	(Hong Kong) Chun Hay Chan	(Japan) Hajime Sakauchi	(Japan) Arata Imai	
2023	(Japan) Hajime Sakauchi	(Japan) Arata Imai	(Japan) Arika Kato	(Japan) Hiraku Fujii	
2024	(Japan) Hajime Sakauchi	(Japan) Arata Imai	(Hong Kong) Chun Hay Chan	(Japan) Arika Kato	
2025	(Japan) Arata Imai	(Japan) Hajime Sakauchi	(Japan) Yamato Fujiwara	(Japan) Taichi Takagi	
2026	(Hong Kong) Chun Hay Chan	(Hong Kong) Man Ki Liu	(Japan) Hajime Sakauchi	(Japan) Arata Imai	

==== 3A ====
Also known as AAA or "Triple A".

Year	Winner	2nd	3rd	4th	Ref.
World Yo-Yo Contest
2003	(Japan) Daisuke Shimada	(Japan) Jun Aramaki	(Japan) Yu Kawada	(United States) Paul Yath	
2004	(Japan) Daisuke Shimada	(Japan) Yuki Tanami	(Japan) Maya Nakamura	(United States) Paul Yath	
2005	(Japan) Daisuke Shimada	(Japan) Maya Nakamura	(Japan) Masanobu Iwata	(Japan) Kentaro Kimura	
2006	(United States) Paul Yath	(Japan) Yuki Tanami	(Japan) Kentaro Kimura	(Japan) Daisuke Shimada	
2007	(Japan) Yuki Tanami	(Japan) Kentaro Kimura	(Japan) Daisuke Shimada	(United States) Hank Freeman	
2008	(Japan) Hiroki Miyamoto	(Japan) Kentaro Kimura	(United States) Hank Freeman	(Japan) Masanobu Iwata	
2009	(Japan) Kentaro Kimura	(Japan) Hiroki Miyamoto	(Japan) Taiichiro Higashi	(United States) Paul Yath	
2010	(Japan) Minato Furuta	(Japan) Taiichiro Higashi	(United States) Hank Freeman	(Japan) Takeshi Matsuura	
2011	(United States) Hank Freeman	(United States) Alex Hattori	(Japan) Taiichiro Higashi	(Japan) Minato Furuta	
2012	(United States) Hank Freeman	(Hong Kong) Wang-Kit Ng	(Japan) Minato Furuta	(Japan) Ken Takabayashi	
International Yo-Yo Federation
2013	(United States) Hank Freeman	(United States) Patrick Borgerding	(Japan) Yasuki Tachibana	(Japan) Kentaro Kimura	
2014	(Japan) Hajime Miura	(United States) Hank Freeman	(Japan) Minato Furuta	(Japan) Mizuki Takimoto	
2015	(Japan) Hajime Miura	(United States) Alex Hattori	(United States) Hank Freeman	(Japan) Mizuki Takimoto	
2016	(Japan) Hajime Miura	(Japan) Tomoya Kurita	(United States) Alex Hattori	(United States) Hank Freeman	
2017	(Japan) Hajime Miura	(Japan) Minato Furuta	(United States) Alex Hattori	(Japan) Tomoya Kurita	
2018	(Japan) Hajime Miura	(United States) Alex Hattori	(Japan) Minato Furuta	(Singapore) Thawhir Iqbal	
2019	(Japan) Hajime Miura	(United States) Alex Hattori	(Japan) Tomoya Kurita	(Japan) Minato Furuta	
2023	(Japan) Hajime Miura	(Japan) Minato Furuta	(Japan) Sora Tahira	(Japan) Tomoya Kurtia	
2024	(Japan) Minato Furuta	(Japan) Sora Tahira	(Japan) Tomoya Kurtia	(Japan) Hajime Miura	
2025	(Japan) Hajime Miura	(Japan) Tomoya Kurita	(Japan) Minato Furuta	(South Korea) Jiho Oh	
2026	(Japan) Tomoya Kurita	(South Korea) Jiho Oh	(Japan) Minato Furuta	(Japan) Sora Tahira	

==== 4A ====
Also known as "Offstring".

Year	Winner	2nd	3rd	4th	Ref.
World Yo-Yo Contest
2003	(Japan) Eiji Okuyama	(Japan) Atsushi Yamada	(Japan) Shingo Terada	(Japan) Kenji Eto	
2004	(Japan) Tsubasa Onishi	(Japan) Kunihisa Kawabe	(Japan) Koichiro Mori	(Japan) Eiji Okuyama	
2005	(United States) John Narum	(Japan) Eiji Okuyama	(United States) Jimmy Peng	(Japan) Tsubasa Onishi	
2006	(Japan) Taiki Nishimura	(Japan) Tsubasa Onishi	(Japan) Eiji Okuyama	(Japan) Rei Iwakura	
2007	(Japan) Eiji Okuyama	(Japan) Rei Iwakura	(Japan) Tsubasa Onishi	(Japan) Atsushi Yamada	
2008	(Japan) Rei Iwakura	(United States) John Narum	(Japan) Yohei Kagawa	(Japan) Atsushi Yamada	
2009	(Japan) Naoto Okada	(Japan) Rei Iwakura	(Japan) Tsubasa Onishi	(United States) Bryan Figueroa	
2010	(Japan) Tsubasa Onishi	(Japan) Rei Iwakura	(Japan) Naoto Okada	(United States) John Narum	
2011	(Japan) Naoto Okada	(United States) Bryan Figueroa	(Japan) Tsubasa Onishi	(United States) Ben Conde	
2012	(Japan) Rei Iwakura	(United States) Bryan Figueroa	(Japan) Naoto Okada	(United States) Ben Conde	
International Yo-Yo Federation
2013	(United States) Michael Nakamura	(Japan) Naoto Okada	(Hong Kong) Chun Hin Chan	(Brazil) Gustavo Amaral	
2014	(Japan) Rei Iwakura	(United States) Michael Nakamura	(Japan) Naoto Okada	(United States) Ian Johnson	
2015	(Japan) Naoto Onishi	(Japan) Takumi Yasumoto	(Japan) Rei Iwakura	(United States) Michael Nakamura	
2016	(Japan) Rei Iwakura	(Japan) Tsubasa Onishi	(United States) Michael Nakamura	(Japan) Yuki Uchida	
2017	(Japan) Rei Iwakura	(United States) Michael Nakamura	(China) Chen Zhao	(Japan) Yuki Uchida	
2018	(Japan) Hajime Miura	(Japan) Tsubasa Onishi	(Japan) Rei Iwakura	(Japan) Koyo Hashimoto	
2019	(Japan) Rei Iwakura	(Japan) Tsubasa Onishi	(Japan) Yuki Uchida	(Japan) Koyo Hashimoto	
2023	(South Korea) Gun Ju Eom	(Japan) Rei Iwakura	(Japan) Koyo Hashimoto	(Japan) Tsubasa Takada	
2024	(United States) Ryan Connolly	(Japan) Kaoru Nakamura	(Japan) Koyo Hashimoto	(South Korea) Gunju Eom	
2025	(Japan) Kaoru Nakamura	(South Korea) Gunju Eom	(China) Bin Ge	(United States) Ryan Connolly	
2026	(Japan) Koyo Hashimoto	(Taiwan) Hong Lun Chang	(China) Haobo Liu	(Japan) Kento Imamura	

==== 5A ====
Also known as "Counterweight" or "Freehand".

Year	Winner	2nd	3rd	4th	Ref.
World Yo-Yo Contest
2003	(Brazil) Rafael Matsunaga	(Japan) Makoto Numagami	(Japan) Shingo Terada	(United States) Matt Schmidt	
2004	(Japan) Makoto Numagami	(Brazil) Rafael Matsunaga	(Japan) Shingo Terada	(Singapore) Andrew Lin Yikai	
2005	(Japan) Maya Nakamura	(Japan) Makoto Numagami	(Singapore) Andrew Lin Yikai	(Brazil) Rafael Matsunaga	
2006	(United States) Dana Bennett	(United States) Jake Bullock	(United States) Andrew 'AJ' Kirk	(United States) Tyler Severance	
2007	(United States) Tyler Severance	(Japan) Takeshi Matsuura (tie)	(United States) Dana Bennett	(United States) Miguel Correa	
2007	(United States) Tyler Severance	(Japan) Sojun Miyamura (tie)	(United States) Dana Bennett	(United States) Miguel Correa	
2008	(Japan) Takeshi Matsuura	(United States) Sterling Quinn	(Japan) Takuma Inoue	(United States) Miguel Correa	
2009	(Japan) Takuma Inoue	(United States) Miguel Correa	(United States) Tyler Severance	(United States) Sterling Quinn	
2010	(Japan) Takeshi Matsuura	(United States) Sterling Quinn	(United States) Miguel Correa	(United States) Tyler Severance	
2011	(Japan) Takeshi Matsuura	(Japan) Takuma Inoue	(United States) Samm Scott	(United States) Tyler Severance	
2012	(Japan) Takeshi Matsuura	(Japan) Takuma Inoue	(Japan) Hiroyasu Ishihara	(Japan) Hideo Ishida	
International Yo-Yo Federation
2013	(Japan) Takeshi Matsuura	(United States) Tyler Severance	(United States) Samm Scott	(Japan) Hideo Ishida	
2014	(Japan) Takeshi Matsuura	(United States) Jake Elliott	(Japan) Sora Ishikawa	(Hong Kong) Ko Kwan Ho	
2015	(United States) Jake Elliot	(Japan) Takeshi Matsuura	(Japan) Sora Ishikawa	(Japan) Michael Nakamura	
2016	(Japan) Takeshi Matsuura	(United States) Jake Elliot	(Japan) Sora Ishikawa	(Japan) Naoya Takeuchi	
2017	(Japan) Takuma Inoue	(Japan) Naoya Takeuchi	(Japan) Hideo Ishida	(United States) Bryan Jardin	
2018	(Japan) Sora Ishikawa	(Japan) Hideo Ishida	(Japan) Yoshihiro Abe	(Hong Kong) Ko Kwan Ho	
2019	(Japan) Hideo Ishida	(Japan) Yoshihiro Abe	(Japan) Sora Ishikawa	(Japan) Naoya Takeuchi	
2023	(Japan) Sora Ishikawa	(Japan) Shigehiro Yamada	(Japan) Hideo Ishida	(Philippines) Miggy Hizon	
2024	(South Korea) Jihoo Lee	(Japan) Naoki Uemae	(Japan) Sora Ishikawa	(Japan) Yoshihiro Abe	
2025	(Japan) Sora Ishikawa	(South Korea) Jihoo Lee	(Philippines) Miggy Hizon	(Japan) Naoki Uemae	
2026	(South Korea) Jihoo Lee	(Japan) Shigehiro Yamada	(Japan) Sora Ishikawa	(Japan) Naoki Uemae	

Over-40 Freestyle

Year	Winner	2nd	3rd	4th	Ref.
International Yo-Yo Federation
2015	(Japan) Kiyoshi Kawamura	(Hong Kong) Wong, Man Kin(Ken)	(Mexico) Isaac Kanarek	(Japan) Minoru Arai	
2016	(Japan) Takahiko HASEGAWA	(United States) Steve Brown	(United States) Richard Brown	(United States) Adam Lord	
2017	(United States) Steve Brown	(United States) Jose Madrigal	(United States) Dale Oliver	(United States) Jon Gates	
2018	(Japan) Koji Torita	(Hong Kong) Wong, Man Kin(Ken)	(Japan) Takahiko Hasegawa	(Japan) Tomoya Isoshima	
2019	(Japan) Takahiko HASEGAWA	(Mexico) Isaac Kanarek	(United States) Mykk EL-AHRAIRAH	(United States) Matthew GIROUX	
2023 Open Class	(Japan) Takenori Iguchi	(Japan) Masayuki Abe	(Japan) Tatsuya Kikuchi	(Japan) Kenta Takahashi	
2023 Master Class	(Japan) Masakazu Yamasaki	(Japan) Tomiyuki Watanabe	(Japan) Takayasu Murakami	(Japan) Fumiaki Daito	
2024 Open Class	(United States) Kira Morrow	(Netherlands) Alexander Noot	(Mexico) Isaac Kanarek	(United States) Jonathan Brasell	
2024 Master Class	(Italy) Lorenzo Sabatini	(Hong Kong) Wong, Wai Sheuk (Simpson)	(Japan) Teruo Kameya	(Australia) Benjamin McPhee	
2025	(Hong Kong) Wong, Wai Sheuk (Simpson)	(Italy) Lorenzo Sabatini	(Hong Kong) Cheung, Chi Wing	(Japan) Hiroyasu Ishihara	

=== Online World Yo-Yo Contest ===
As a result of the COVID-19 pandemic, the 2020 World Yo-Yo Contest was canceled. Since the World Yo-Yo Contest could not be held as a result of the pandemic and the various travel restrictions it caused, the Online World Yo-Yo Contest was created. As the name suggests, the contests were held online. The winners of the Online World Yo-Yo Contest do not gain the title of World Yo-Yo Champion, however. The title they receive is that of Online World Yo-Yo Champion (in their respective divisions).

==== 1A ====
Year	Winner	2nd	3rd	4th	Ref.
World Yo-Yo Contest
2021	Mir Kim	Akitoshi Tokubuchi	Park Junsang	Kohei Nishimura	
2022	Mir Kim	Akitoshi Tokubuchi	Park Junsang	Ryuichi Nakamura	

==== 2A ====
Year	Winner	2nd	3rd	4th	Ref.
World Yo-Yo Contest
2021	Shu Takada	Satoshi Yamanaka	Wasakorn Lattilertwi	Kenshiro Osada	
2022	Hiraku Fujii	Hajime Sakauchi	Arata Imai	Akira Kato	

==== 3A ====
Year	Winner	2nd	3rd	4th	Ref.
World Yo-Yo Contest
2021	Minato Furuta	Tomoya Kurita	Mizuki Takimoto	Qing Yang	
2022	Tomoya Kurita	Minato Furuta	Dongyoung Kim	Thawhir Iqbal	

==== 4A ====
Year	Winner	2nd	3rd	4th	Ref.
World Yo-Yo Contest
2021	Kaoru Nakamura	Tsubasa Onishi	Yuki Uchida	Tomohiko Zanka	
2022	Kaoru Nakamura	Gunju Eom	Tomohiko Zanka	Taiyo Katsumata	

==== 5A ====
Year	Winner	2nd	3rd	4th	Ref.
World Yo-Yo Contest
2021	Sora Ishikawa	Yoshihiro Abe	Hideo Ishida	Naoki Uemae	
2022	Sora Ishikawa	Jihoo Lee	Yuki Sakamoto	Naoya Takeuchi	

==== Women's ====
Year	Winner	2nd	3rd	4th	Ref.
World Yo-Yo Contest
2021	Miri Kim	Veronika Kamenská	Hobbit Xiao-Wen Wang	Ziyu Meng	
2022	Miri Kim	Xueqing Yang	Ziyu Meng	Kira Morrow	

==== Over 40 ====
Year	Winner	2nd	3rd	4th	Ref.
World Yo-Yo Contest
2021	Ricardo Marechal	Benjamin McPhee	Tomomi Matsuda	Patrick Jüptner	
2022	Lorenzo Sabatini	Ricardo Marechal	Tomoya Isoshima	Tomomi Matsuda	

=== Former ===
==== X ====
The X division was separated into three new divisions (3A, 4A, 5A) in 2003.

Year	Winner	2nd	3rd	4th	Ref.
World Yo-Yo Contest
2000	(Japan) Hironori Mii	(Japan) Takahiko Hasagawa	(United States) 'Doctor Popular' Brian Roberts	(Japan) Shingo Terada	
2001	(Japan) Shingo Terada	(Japan) Takahiko Hasegawa	(Japan) Jun Aramaki	(Japan) Hironiri Mii	
2002	(Japan) Daisuke Shimada	(Japan) Tsubasa Onishi	(Japan) Takahiko Hasegawa	(Japan) Hironiri Mii	

==== CB ====
Year	Winner	2nd	3rd	4th	Ref.
World Yo-Yo Contest
2006	(Japan) Shinji Saito	(United States) Shane Karan	(Japan) Rei Iwakura	?	
2007	(Japan) Shinji Saito	(Japan) Ryusei Saito	(United States) John Narum	(Germany) Dave Geigle	
2008	(Japan) Shinji Saito	(United States) John Narum	(Germany) Dave Geigle	(Japan) Takeshi Matsuura	
2009	(Japan) Shinji Saito	(Japan) Naoto Okada	(Japan) Rei Iwakura	(Japan) Yasushi Furukawa	

=== Winner's table ===
All champions and runners-up (1998–present)
Rank 1	Name	1st	2nd	3rd	Total 1	Years: Division Champion	Years: Division Runner-up
1	Shinji Saito	13	1	0	14	2A (2002, 2003, 2004, 2005, 2006, 2008, 2007, 2009, 2011, 2015); CB (2006, 2007, 2008, 2009)	
2	Takeshi Matsuura	7	4	0	11	5A (2008, 2010, 2011, 2012, 2013, 2014, 2016)	5A (2007, 15); 1A (14, 18)
3	Hajime Miura	9	0	0	9	3A (2014, 2015, 2016, 2017, 2018, 2019, 2023, 2025); 4A (18)	
4	Rei Iwakura	6	4	4	14	4A (2008, 2009 AP, 12, 14, 16, 17, 19)	4A (2007, 09, 10, 23)
5	Hiroyuki Suzuki	4	5	1	10	1A (2004, 05, 06, 12)	1A (2002, 07, 08, 09, 10)
6	Takuma Yamamoto	4	2	6	12	2A (2008, 13, 14, 19)	2A (2012, 18)
7	Shu Takada	4	2	1	7	2A (2012, 16, 17, 18)	2A (2013, 15)
8	Daisuke Shimada	4	1	5	10	X (2002); 3A (03, 04, 05)	
9	Hank Freeman	3	1	3	7	3A (2011, 12, 13)	3A (2014)
10	Tsubasa Onishi	2	5	3	10	4A (2004, 10)	X (2002); 4A (2006, 16, 17, 19)
11	Naoto Okada	2	2	3	7	4A (2009, 11)	CB (2009)
12	Takuma Inoue	2	2	1	5	5A (2009, 17)	5A (2011, 12)
13	Yuuki Spencer	2	1	1	4	1A (2002, 07)	1A (2005)
14	Eiji Okuyama	2	1	1	4	4A (2003, 07)	4A (2005)
15	Shion Araya	2	1	0	3	1A (2016, 17)	1A (2015)
16	Gentry Stein	2	0	2	4	1A (2014, 19)	1A (2017)
17	Mir Kim	3	0	0	3	1A (2023, 2024, 2025)	
18	Yasushi Furukawa	1	3	0	4	2A (2010)	2A (2009, 11, 14)
19	John Narum	1	2	1	4	4A (2005)	4A (2008), CB (08)
20	Kentaro Kimura	1	2	1	4	3A (2009)	3A (2007, 08)
21	Minato Furuta	1	2	3	6	3A (2010)	3A (2017, 23)
22	Michael Nakamura	1	2	1	4	4A (2013)	4A (2014, 17)
23	Makoto Numagami	1	2	0	3	5A (2004)	5A (2003, 05)
24	Yuki Tanami	1	2	0	3	3A (2007)	3A (2004, 07)
25	Jake Elliot	1	2	0	3	5A (2015)	5A (2014, 16)
26	Tomonari Ishiguru	1	1	1	3	1A (2001)	1A (2004)
27	Evan Nagao	1	1	1	3	1A (2018)	1A (2019)
28	Maya Nakamura	1	1	1	3	5A (2005)	3A (2005)
29	Tyler Severance	1	1	1	3	5A (2007)	5A (2013)
30	Hideo Ishida	1	1	2	4	5A (2019)	5A (2018)
31	Hironiri Mii	1	1	0	2	X (2000)	1A (1999)
32	Rafael Matsunaga	1	1	0	2	5A (2003)	5A (2004)
33	Hiroki Miyamoto	1	1	0	2	3A (2008)	3A (2009)
34	Jin-Hao Koh	1	1	0	2	1A (2011)	1A (2012)
35	Shingo Terada	1	0	3	4	X (2001)	
36	Yu Kawada	1	0	1	2	1A (2000)	
37	Dana Bennet	1	0	1	2	5A (2006)	
38	Zach Gormley	1	0	1	2	1A (2015)	
39	Jennifer Baybrook	1	0	0	1	2A (1998)	
40	Joel Zink	1	0	0	1	1A (1999)	
41	Matt Harlow	1	0	0	1	2A (2001)	
42	Johnnie DelValle	1	0	0	1	1A (2003)	
43	Paul Yath	1	0	0	1	3A (2006)	
44	Taiki Nishimura	1	0	0	1	4A (2006)	
45	Shinya Kido	1	0	0	1	1A (2009)	
46	Jensen Kimmitt	1	0	0	1	1A (2010)	
47	János Karancz	1	0	0	1	1A (2013)	
48	Naoto Onishi	1	0	0	1	4A (2015)	
49	Koji Yokoyama	0	8	1	9		2A (1999, 2000, 01, 03, 04, 05, 06, 07)
50	Alex Hattori	0	4	2	6		3A (2011, 15, 18, 19)
51	Hiraku Fuji	0	3	5	8		2A (2004, 16, 17)
52	Takahiko Hasegawa	0	2	1	3		X (2000, 01)
53	Sterling Quinn	0	2	0	2		5A (2008, 10)
54	Bryan Figueroa	0	2	0	2		4A (2011, 12)
55	Ryusei Saito	0	1	3	4		CB (2007)
56	Taiichiro Higashi	0	1	3	4		3A (2010)
57	Ryo Yamashita	0	1	2	3		2A (2010)
58	Christopher Chia	0	1	2	3		1A (2013)
59	Yukihiro Suzuki	0	1	1	2		2A (2002)
60	Jun Aramki	0	1	1	2		3A (2003)
61	Paul Han	0	1	1	2		1A (2006)
62	Tomoya Kurita	0	1	1	2		3A (2016)
63	Yoshihiro Abe	0	1	1	2		5A (2019)
64	Ross Pascual	0	1	0	1		1A (1998)
65	Hidemasa Semba	0	1	0	1		1A (2000)
66	Brent Dellinger	0	1	0	1		1A (2003)
67	Atsushi Yamada	0	1	0	1		4A (2003)
68	Kunihisa Kawabe	0	1	0	1		4A (2004)
69	Shane Karan	0	1	0	1		CB (2006)
70	Jake Bullock	0	1	0	1		5A (2006)
71	Sojun Miyamura	0	1	0	1		5A (2007)
72	Sebastian Brock	0	1	0	1		1A (2011)
73	Wang-Kit Ng	0	1	0	1		3A (2012)
74	Takumi Yasumoto	0	1	0	1		4A (2015)
75	Yamato Murata	0	1	0	1		1A (2016)
76	Andrew Bergen	0	1	0	1		1A (2017)
77	Naoya Takeuchi	0	1	0	1		5A (2017)
78	Chun Hay Chan	0	1	0	1		2A (2019)

== Non-solo divisions ==
=== Current ===
==== AP ====
Also known as "Artistic Performance".

Grand Prix
Year	Winner		2nd	3rd		Ref.
World Yo-Yo Contest
2002	(Japan) Takahiko Hasegawa		(Japan) Hironori Mii	(Japan) Shingo Terada		
2003	(United States) Mark Montgomary		(Japan) Tomiyuki Watanabe	(United States) Dave Bazan		
2004	(Japan) Tomiyuki Watanabe		(Japan) Yu Kawada	(United States) Jennifer Baybrook		
2005	(Japan) Takahiko Hasegawa		(Japan) Hironori Mii	(Japan) Tomiyuki Watanabe		
2006	(Japan) Yu Kawada		(Japan) Tomiyuki Watanabe	(Japan) Tomonori Ishiguro		
2007	(Japan) Tomonari 'Black' Ishiguro		(Japan) Rei Iwakura	(United States) Steve Brown		
2008	(United States) John Higby		(Japan) Rei Iwakura	(Japan) Tomiyuki Watanabe		
2009	(Japan) Rei Iwakura		(Japan) Tomiyuki Watanabe	(Japan) Hironori Mii		
2010	Shaqler	(Japan) Atsushi 'A2C' Yamada; (United States) John 'Ryuji' Ando; (Japan) Shigesato 'Kuri' Kurita; (Japan) Takeshi 'Woodz' Maruyama	(Japan) Rei Iwakura	(Japan) Takahiko Hasegawa		
2011	(Japan) Takahiko Hasegawa		(United States) Justin Weber	(Japan) Hironori Mii		
2012	inmot!on	(Switzerland) Ivo Studer; (Switzerland) Jan Schmutz	(Japan) Takahiko Hasegawa	(Japan) Tomiyuki Watanabe		
International Yo-Yo Federation
2013	Spination	(Japan) Tomiyuki Watanabe; (Japan) Yu Kawada	(Taiwan) Chih-Min Tuan	W.H.O. Theatre	(Taiwan) Ren-Zhi Yang; (Taiwan) Tzu-Wei Chang	
2014	Spination	(Japan) Tomiyuki Watanabe; (Japan) Yu Kawada				
2015	Shaqler	(Japan) Atsushi 'A2C' Yamada; (United States) John 'Ryuji' Ando; (Japan) Shu Takada; (Japan) Takeshi 'Woodz' Maruyama				
2016	Not awarded					
2017	inmot!on	(Switzerland) Ivo Studer; (Switzerland) Jan Schmutz				
2018	Old Skool Famous	(Japan) Hiraku Fujii; (Japan) Shuhei Kanai; (Japan) Tsubasa Ōnishi				
2019	(Japan) Shu Takada					
2023	(Spain) Daniel Tamariz					
2024	(United States) Justin Weber		(Japan) Ryo Oishi		(Taiwan) Yoyo Yang & Yoyo Yen	

Other awards
Year	Entertainment Award		Artistic Award		Creativity Award		Ref.
Year	Team	Members	Team	Members	Team	Members	Ref.
International Yo-Yo Federation
2014	Not awarded		Spination	(Japan) Tomiyuki Watanabe; (Japan) Yū Kawada	(Taiwan) Chih-Min Tuan		
2015	Shaqler	(Japan) Atsushi 'A2C' Yamada; (United States) John 'Ryuji' Ando; (Japan) Shigesato 'Kuri' Kurita; (Japan) Takeshi 'Woodz' Maruyama	Beat Poin't	(Japan) Masakazu Yamazaki; (Japan) Tooru Abe	W.H.O Theatre	(Taiwan) Chih-Han Chao; (Taiwan) Ren-Jhih Yang; (Taiwan) Tzu-Wei Chang; (Taiwan) Zhao-Xian Pan	
2016	Old Skool Famous	(Japan) Hiraku Fujii; (Japan) Shuhei Kanai; (Japan) Tsubasa Ōnishi	(Japan) Tomiyuki Watanabe		Not awarded		
2017	inmot!on	(Switzerland) Ivo Studer; (Switzerland) Jan Schmutz	Not awarded		Not awarded		
2018	Old Skool Famous	(Japan) Hiraku Fujii; (Japan) Shuhei Kanai; (Japan) Tsubasa Ōnishi	TR-Yo Team	(Malaysia) Hong Xin Cham; (Malaysia) Jia Cheng 'Stanley' Low; (Malaysia) Jia Xin Lee; (Malaysia) Jiann Yow Toh; (Malaysia) Jun Sheng Ho; (Malaysia) Sin Yu Wee; (Malaysia) Yong Leong 'Jerard' Loo; (Malaysia) Zi Hao Chew	Not awarded		
2019	Not awarded		(Japan) Shu Takada		Not awarded		
2023	(Spain) Daniel Tamariz		(Japan) Ryo Oishi		(Spain) Daniel Tamariz		

=== Former ===
==== Team ====
Was replaced by the AP division in 2002.

Year	Winner		2nd		3rd		Ref.
Year	Team	Members	Team	Members	Team	Members	Ref.
HPK Marketing
1999	Team Heimlech	(United States) Alan Batangan; (United States) Cody Kyabu; (United States) Ryan Lai; (United States) Sky Kyabu	Gotemba Pinocchio	(Japan); (Japan); (Japan); (Japan)	Team; 4 Angels	(United States); (United States); (United States); (United States)	
1999 (Mega Team)	Hooters	(United States) Alan Batagan; (United States) Allan Leal; (United States) Casey Kodama; (United States) Cody Kiyabu; (United States) Devin Yamada; (United States) Eric Masumori; (United States) Gabriel Cabagbag; (United States) Ian Hoshino; (United States) Nana Sakamoto; (United States) Paul Han; (United States) Ryan Kono; (United States) Ryan Lai; (United States) Yves Young	Junk THP Japan	(Japan) Junpei Suzuki; (Japan) Kazuki Abe; (Japan) Keiichi Kura; (Japan) Keijiro Hasegawa; (Japan) Keita Saito; (Japan) Koji Yokoyama; (Japan) Masaya Shimazaki; (Japan) Takumi Nagase; (Japan) Yuji Hattori; (Japan) Yuji Imatuji; (Japan) Yuki Kudo		(United States) Brad Durnas; (United States) Chris Ciosek; (United States) Dwane Forter; (United States) Eric Mitz; (United States) Eric Twark; (United States) Jeff Medeiros; (United States) Jerry Yuan; (United States) Joey Lacerday; (United States) Jon McNulty; (United States) Matt Kubera; (United States) Matt Rose; (United States) Mike Carreiro	
World Yo-Yo Contest
2000	Team; Off String	(Japan) Hironori Mii; (Japan) Kota Watanabe; (Japan) Shingo Terada; (Japan) Takahiko Hasegawa; (Japan) Yu Kawada	Chocko Ball Family	?; ?; ?; ?; ?	Others D	(Japan) Hidemasa Semba; (Japan) Jun Aramaki; (Japan) Masato Inohara; (Japan) Ryusei Saito	
2001	Out of America	(United States) Patrick Mitchell; (United States); (United States); (United States); (United States); (United States)	Team TOP	(Japan) Jun Aramaki; (Japan) Tomiyuki Watanabe; (Japan); (Japan); (Japan); (Japan)	Team; Off String	(Japan) Hironori Mii; (Japan) Kenji Eto; (Japan) Kota Watanabe; (Japan) Shingo Terada; (Japan) Takahiko Hasegawa; (Japan) Yu Kawada	

== Additional solo divisions ==
=== Current ===
==== Women only ====
Year	Winner	2nd	3rd
2014	(United States) Tessa Piccillo	(Poland) Julia Aleksandra Gutowska	(South Africa) Corli du Toit
2015	(Taiwan) Xiao-Wen 'Hobbit' Wang	(Mexico) Beatriz Gallegos 'Betty' Garcia	(Japan) Reia Torita
2016	(Mexico) Beatriz Gallegos 'Betty' Garcia	(United States) Tessa Piccillo	(United States) Stephanie Height
2017	(United States) Tessa Piccillo	(Mexico) Beatriz Gallegos 'Betty' Garcia	(Taiwan) Xiao-Wen 'Hobbit' Wang
2018	(Taiwan) Xiao-Wen 'Hobbit' Wang	(China) Ni Kang	(Japan) Reia Torita
2019	(Mexico) Beatriz Gallegos 'Betty' Garcia	(South Korea) Miri Kim	(United States) Tessa Piccillo
2023	(South Korea) Miri Kim	(Mexico) Beatriz Gallegos 'Betty' Garcia	(China) Wan Jiang Liu

==== 40 and over ====
Year	Winner	2nd	3rd
2015	(Japan) Kiyoshi Kawamura	(Hong Kong) Ken Wong	(Mexico) Isaac Kanarek
2016	(Japan) Takahiko Hasegawa	(United States) Steve Brown	(United States) Richard Cobb
2017	(United States) Steve Brown	(United States) Jose Madrigal	(United States) Dale Oliver
2018	(Japan) Kōji Torita	(Hong Kong) Man-Kin Wong	(Japan) Takahiko Hasegawa
2019	(Japan) Takahiko Hasegawa	(United States) Isaac Kanarek	(United States) Myk el-Ahrairah

=== Former ===
==== Ladder ====
Was known as "Compulsory" in 1997 and as "Advanced/Recreational" in 1998 and 1999.

Year	Winner	2nd	3rd	Ref.
International Jugglers' Association
1997	(United States) Jason Tracy	(Japan) Kenichi Nakamura	(United States) Nalukai Hookano	
MPK Marketing
1998	(United States) Ed Giulietti	(United States) Valerie Krantz	(United States) Joel Zink	
1999	(United States) Ryan Zink	(Japan) Junichi Morita	(United States) Nemec Marcus	

== Non-yoyo divisions ==
=== SpinTop ===
The SpinTop World Championships were held during the WYCC from 2000 until 2019 under the auspices of the International Top Spinners Association (ITSA). Since 2020 there have been held outside WYCC.

==== Freestyle ====
Year	Winner	2nd	3rd
2000	(United States) John Gates	(United States) Steve Brown	(United States) Dale Oliver
2001	(United States) Felix Avellana	(United States) Dale Oliver	(United States) Mark Vargas
2002	(United States) Dave Bazan	(United States) Felix Avellana	(United States) Mark Hayward
2003	(United States) Miguel Correa	(United States) Andre Boulay	(United States) Takeshi Kamisato
2004	(United States) Matt Ritter	(United States) Miguel Correa	(United States) Jon Gates
2005	(United States) Dave Bazan	(United States) Jon Gates	(United States) Takeshi Kamisato
2006	(United States) Matt Ritter	(United States) Takeshi Kamisato	(United States) Alan Gray
2007	(United States) Matt Ritter	(United States) Takeshi Kamisato	(Uruguay) Jorge Alcoz
2008	(United States) Jon Gates	(United States) Mike Hout	(United States) Tom Connoly
2009	(Uruguay) Jorge Alcoz	(United States) Felix Avellana	(United States) Mike Hout
2010	(United States) Darren Kim	(United States) Chris Neff	(United States) Mike Hout
2011	(United States) Chris Neff	(United States) Darren Kim	(United States) Omar Garza
2012	(Nicaragua) Carlos Solís	(United States) Brian Caster	(United States) Mark Hayward
2013	(Mexico) Gustavo Castro	(United States) Tyler Young	(Mexico) Salvador Martinez
2014	(United States) Tyler Young	(Czech Republic) Daniel Konecny	(Czech Republic) Jakub Konecny
2015	(Uruguay) Jorge Alcoz	(Japan) Kazuhito Miki	(Japan) Keita Watanabe
2016	(United States) Chris Neff	(United States) Eli Hickerson	(Japan) Takahiko Hasegawa
2017	(Czech Republic) Jakub Konecny	(Czech Republic) Daniel Konecny	(United States) Jose Madrigal
2018	(Japan) Kanta Tani	(Japan) Jun Shimamura	(Japan) Takahiko Hasegawa
2019	(United States) Eli Hickerson (tie)		(Japan) Takahiko Hasegawa
2019	(United States) Jose Madrigal (tie)		(Japan) Takahiko Hasegawa
2020	(Spain) Guillem Vizcaino	(Japan) Kanta Tani	(Mexico) Gerardo Montero
2021	(Japan) Kanta Tani	(United States) Eli Hickerson	(United States) Marcus Heineck
2022	(Japan) Kanta Tani	(United States) Marcus Heineck	(Japan) Jun Shimamura
2023	(Japan) Jun Shimamura	(Mexico) Yahir Ortega	(Japan) Nobuyoshi Hasegawa
2024	(Japan) Kanta Tani	(Japan) Jun Shimamura	(Mexico) Yahir Ortega

==== Fixed tip ====
Year	Winner	2nd	3rd
2011	(United States) Mike Hout	(United States) Chris Neff	(United States) Darren Kim

==== Ladder ====
Year	Winner	2nd	3rd
2013	(United States) Eli Hickerson	(Mexico) Miguel Angel Chavez	(United States) Kirk Charles

=== Diabolo ===
Year	Winner	2nd	3rd
2007	?	?	?
2008	Ryuya Kaneko (Japan)	Rei Iwakura (Japan)	Hadrien Bennaceur (France)
2009	Rei Iwakura (Japan)	Kunihisa Kawabe (Japan)	Shane Smith (Japan)
2010	Kousuke Yoshida (Japan)	Yu Tsumura (Japan)	Naoshi Terasawa (Japan)
2011	?	?	?
2012	Ryuya Kaneko(Japan)	Ouka(Japan)	Yu Tsumura(United States)

== Non-world championships ==
=== Fixed Axle ===
Year	Winner	2nd	3rd
HPK Marketing
1999	'Dazzling' Dave Schulte (United States)	Steve Brown (United States)	
World Yo-Yo Contest
2009	Drew Tetz (United States)	Jeff Coons (United States)	Ed Haponik (United States)
2010	Randy Jansen (United States)	Drew Tetz (United States)	Stefan Benjamin (United Kingdom)
2011	Colin Leland (United States)	Nate Sutter (United States)	Jacob Jensen (United States)
2012	Ed Haponik (United States)	Ben Conde (United States)	Drew Tetz (United States)
2013	Ben Conde (United States)	Nate Sutter (United States)	Ed Haponik (United States)
2016	Ed Haponik (United States)	Mark McBride (United States)	
2019	Kyle Nations (United States)	John Russeth (United States)	

=== 100m race ===
==== One-Hand Loops ====
Year	Winner	2nd	3rd
International Jugglers' Association
1996	(United States) Dale Oliver	(United States) Dale Myrberg	(United States) Bill de Boisblanc
1997	(Japan) Kenichi Nakamura		

==== Two-Hand Loops ====
Year	Winner	2nd	3rd
International Jugglers' Association
1996	(United States) Steve Brown	(United States) Mark Anderson	(United States) Jon Gates
1997	(United States) Alex Garcia		

=== Design contests ===
==== Mod ====
Year	Winner	2nd	3rd
World Yo-Yo Contest
2001	Maurice Chavez (United States)	Alan Gray (United States)	Takahiro Hasagawa (Japan)
2002	Maurice Chavez (United States)	Matt Schmidt (United States)	Kaz Datashi (Japan)
2003	Maurice Chavez (United States)	John Rollins (United States)	Roberto Jose Dos Santos (Mexico)
2003	Maurice Chavez (United States)	Alan Gray (United States)	Roberto Jose Dos Santos (Mexico)
2004	Shinobu Konmoto (Japan)	Frank Difeo (United States)	John Rollins (United States)
2005	Shinobu Konmoto (Japan)	Marcio Adriano Alves (Brazil)	Dave Poyzer (United States)
2006	Scott Stover (United States)	Shinobu Konmoto (Japan)	Dave Poyzer (United States)
2007	Shinobu Konmoto (Japan)	Steve Chase (United States)	Kokyu Ueda (Japan)
2008	Shinobu Konmoto (Japan)	Yuumi Shiga (Japan)	Kunihisa Kawabe (Japan)
2009	Yuumi Shiga (Japan)	Ettore Ferro (Italy)	Shinobu Konmoto (Japan)
2010	Ettore Ferro (Italy)	Tetsuya Hoshino (Japan)	Landon Balk (United States)
2011	Landon Balk (United States)	Richy Nye (United States)	Perry Prine (United States)
2012	Landon Balk (United States)		

==== Iron Mod ====
Year	Winner	2nd
World Yo-Yo Contest
2005	Takeshi Kamisato (United States)	Rob Tsou (United States)
2005	Seth Peterson (United States)	Kyle Weems (United States)
2006	Eric Wolff (United States)	Takeshi Kamisato (United States)
2006	Alan Gray (United States)	Seth Peterson (United States)
2007	Eric Wolff (United States)	Shinobu Konmato (Japan)
2007	Rob Tsou (United States)	Takahiko Hasegawa (Japan)
2008	Shinobu Konmato (Japan)	Eric Wolff (United States)
2008	Yuumi Shiga (Japan)	Alan Gray (United States)
2009	Yuumi Shiga (Japan)	Eric Wolff (United States)
2009	Takahiko Hasegawa (Japan)	Alan Gray (United States)
2010	Yuumi Shiga (Japan)	Keith Skip Mitton (Australia)
2010	Takahiko Hasegawa (Japan)	Perry Prine (United States)
2011	Perry Prine (United States)	Yuumi Shiga (Japan)
2011	Landon Balk (United States)	Takahiko Hasegawa (Japan)

=== Diabolo ===
==== Ladder (11 and under) ====
Year	Winner	2nd	3rd
2007	Will Neiemier (United States)	?	?
2008	No Entry	No Entry	No Entry
2009	Evan McAleenan (United States)	?	?
2010	Evan McAleenan (United States)	?	?
2011	?	?	?

==== Ladder (12 to 16) ====
Year	Winner	2nd	3rd
2006	Will Niemeier (United States)	Melood Benson (United States)	Dylan Benharris (United States)
2007	Will Neiemier (United States)	?	?
2008	Will Niemeier (United States)	Andrew Ruiz (United States)	Patrick Borgerding (United States)
2009	Will Niemeier (United States)	Andrew Ruiz (United States)	Shane Smith (United States)
2010	Will Niemeier (United States)	?	?
2011	?	?	?

==== Ladder (17 and over) ====
Year	Winner	2nd	3rd
2006	Rei Iwakura (Japan)	Bennaceur Hadrien (France)	Abe Ziaimehr (United States)
2007	Steven Chase (United States)	?	?
2008	Ryuya Kaneko (Japan)	Kunihisa Kawabe (Japan)	Hadrien Bennaceur (France)
2009	David Melons (Japan)	Kunihisa Kawabe (Japan)	Hiraku Fujii (Japan)
2010	Kunihisa Kawabe (Japan)	?	?
2011	?	?	?

=== Sport ===
==== String and Looping ====
===== 7 to 8 =====
Year	Winner	2nd	3rd
2000	Benjamin Conde (United States)	Nicholas Walker (United States)	Ann Connolly (United States)
2001	Benjamin Conde (United States)		

===== 9 to 10 =====
Year	Winner	2nd	3rd
2000	Jimmy Young (United States)	Griffin Cash (United States)	Kendra Krantz (United States)
2001	Jonathan Belcher (United States)	Nicholas Walker (United States)	

===== 11 to 12 =====
Year	Winner	2nd	3rd
2000	Nicky Kodama (United States)	Andrew Silverstein (United States)	Max Bradshaw (United States)
2001	Mikey McCabe (United States)	Koichiro Mori (Japan)	Kevin Elvin (United States)

===== 13 to 14 =====
Year	Winner	2nd	3rd
2000	Matthew Haroney (United States)	Yuusuke Maruyama (Japan)	Tsubasa Onishi (Japan)
2001	Kenta Matsuoka (Japan)	Brad Dumas (United States)	Alex Shahparnia (United States)

===== 15 to 16 =====
Year	Winner	2nd	3rd
2000	Riley Lester (United States)	Dave McLallen (United States)	Jonathan Bryan (United States)
2001	Rob Kitts (United States)	Jessica Noll (United States)	

===== 17 to 25 =====
Year	Winner	2nd	3rd
2000	Yuji Imatsaji (Japan)	Richard Hertzberg (United States)	Daniel Wendland (United States)
2001	Maya Nakamura (Japan)	Naoto (Japan)	Saya Sasaki (Japan)

===== 26 to 45 =====
Year	Winner	2nd	3rd
2000	Greg Beatty (United States)	Keijiro Ono (Japan)	Christal Cullymore (United States)
2001	Thomas Connolly (United States)	Glasseye (United States)	Justin Adam (United States)

===== 46 to 65 =====
Year	Winner	2nd	3rd
2000	Larry Kilby (United States)	Stuart Crump (United States)	Mari McCabe (United States)
2001	John Bozung (United States)	Larry Kilby (United States)	

===== 66 to 106 =====
Year	Winner	2nd	3rd
2001	Gary Hill (United States)		

===== Beginner =====
Year	Winner	2nd	3rd
2000	Sean Curran (United States)	Mike Busch (United States)	Tim Skalland (United States)
2001	Nikoli Zygo (United States)	Dennis Shatter (United States)	Mark Leithead (United States)

===== Advanced =====
Year	Winner	2nd	3rd
2000	Felix Avellana (United States)	Gary Longoria (United States)	David Guttenplan (United States)
2001	Alex Poole (United States)	Valerie Oliver (United States)	Hank Freeman (United States)

===== Expert =====
Year	Winner	2nd	3rd
2000	Jon Gates (United States)	Steve Brown (United States)	Dale Oliver (United States)
2001	Felix Avellana (United States)	Dale Oliver (United States)	Mark Vargas (United States)

==== String ====
===== 7 to 8 =====
Year	Winner	2nd	3rd
2002	William Nix (United States)		
2003	Merged to "10 and under" division		

===== 9 to 10 =====
Year	Winner	2nd	3rd
2002	Ben Conde (United States)	Nicholas Walker (United States)	Graham Nix (United States)
2003	Merged to "10 and under" division		

===== 10 & Under =====
Year	Winner	2nd	3rd
2003	Ben Conde (United States)	John Narum (United States)	
2004	John Bozung	?	?
2005	Isaiah Behhell (United States)	Josh Ellis (United States)	Tylor Mollan (United States)
2006	Sean Micca (United States)	Kevin Clutter (United States)	Matthew Stewart (United States)
2007	Kelly Micca (United States)	Bradlee Nadeau (United States)	Tylor Mollan (United States)
2008	Bryant Baus (United States)		
2009	?	?	Danielle Williams
2010	Dylan Swart (United States)	Connor O'Malley (United States)	(United States)
2011	?	?	?
2012	Hajime Sakauchi (Japan)	Kaleb Zuckerman(United States)	

===== 11 to 12 =====
Year	Winner	2nd	3rd
2002	John Esfeld (United States)	Kevin Elvin (United States)	
2003	Nicholsas Walker (United States)	Ann Connolly (United States)	
2004	?	?	?
2005	Ryan Scott (United States)	Michael Ferdico (United States)	Andrew Ruiz (United States)
2006	Dan Dietz (United States)	Paul Williams (United States)	Jonathan Schwartz (United States)
2007	Nick Kozak (United States)	Ethan Bein (United States)	Theo Viola (United States)
2008	Ben de Wet (South Africa)	Omar Iarranaga, (United States)	Theo Viola (United States)
2009	?	?	?
2010	Morgan Alexander (United States)	Kenneth La (United States)	Chandler Hudson (United States)
2011	?	?	?
2012	Brett Jeffery(United States)	Ben Viore(United States)	

===== 13 to 14 =====
Year	Winner	2nd	3rd
2002	Tom Hebblethwaite (United States)	Koichirou Mori (United States)	Landon Balk (United States)
2003	Merged to "13 to 16" division		

===== 15 to 16 =====
Year	Winner	2nd	3rd
2002	Paul Han (United States)	Adam Denuchy (United States)	Damian Talavera (United States)
2003	Merged to "13 to 16" division		

===== 13 to 16 =====
Year	Winner	2nd	3rd
2002	Paul Han (United States)	Adam Denuchy (United States)	Damian Talavera (United States)
2003	Mike McCabe (United States)	Dennis Slater (United States)	Nick Gumlaw (United States)
2004	?	?	?
2005	Brandon Murphy (United States)	Nicholas Walker (United States)	Mike Cogan (United States)
2006	Chris Hawley (United States)	Alex Brant (United States)	Will Neimeier (United States)
2007	Alex Brant (United States)	Mcleod Benson (United States)	Emmet Yeager (United States)
2008	Mikhail Baklanov (United States)	Andrew Ruiz (United States)	Michael Sparhawk (United States)
2009	?	?	?
2010	Isaac Parris (United States)	Ben Alexander (United States)	Marshall Nye (United States)
2011	Kelly Carney (United States)	Clare Evans (United States)	?
2012	Doug Kapinos(United States)	Nic Patane(United States)	Stephanie Haight(United States)

===== 17 to 29 =====
Year	Winner	2nd	3rd
Started as "17 to 25" division
2002	Masahiro Tanikawa (United States)	Jan Schmutz (Switzerland)	Naoto Ichimura (Japan)
Changed to "17 to 29" division
2003	Nato Ichimura (Japan)	Dave Geigle (Germany)	Mina Tanikawa (United States)
2004	?	?	?
2005	Kengo Okubo (United States)	Saya Sasaki (United States)	John Robot (United States)
2006	Pat Cuartero (United States)	Masanobu Hishida (Japan)	Andrew Robinson (United States)
2007	Hishida Masanobu (Japan)	Saul Arjona (United States)	Pat Cuartero (United States)
2008	Masanobu Hishida (Japan)	Nathan Crissey (United States)	Omar Guitierez (United States)
2009	?	?	?
2010	Landon Balk (United States)	Naoshi Terasawa (United States)	Boyd Seth (United States)
2011	?	?	?
2012	Sho Aketo(Japan)	Boyd Seth(United States)	

===== 30 to 44 =====
Year	Winner	2nd	3rd
Started as "26 to 45" division
2002	John Lindberg (United States)	Tom Connolly (United States)	Dave Bazan (United States)
Changed to "30 to 44" division
2003	Tom Connolly (United States)	Kevin Brumfield (United States)	John Lindberg (United States)
2004	?	?	?
2005	Russell Bean (United States)	Isaac Kanarek (United States)	Andy Brant (United States)
2006	Andy Smith (United States)	Isaac Kanarek (United States)	Kevin Jones (United States)
2007	Ed Haponik (United States)	Chadd Gromaski (United States)	John Shea (United States)
2008	Man-Kin Wong (United States)	Chadd Gromaski (United States)	Isaac Kauarek (United States)
2009	?	?	?
2010	Masanobu Hishida (Japan)	Ed Haponik (United States)	Toby Ratcliffe (United States)
2011	?	?	?
2012	Issac Kanarek(United States)	Ed Haponik(United States)	Bart Cusik(United States)

===== 46 to 65 =====
Year	Winner	2nd	3rd
2002	John Bozung (United States)	Larry Kilby (United States)	Bill Elvin (United States)
2003	Merged to "45 & Over" division		

===== 45 & Over =====
Year	Winner	2nd	3rd
2003	John Bozung (United States)	Larry Kilby (United States)	Jack Finn (United States)
2004	?	?	?
2005	Larry Kirby (United States)	J. Johnoson (United States)	Tom Connolly (United States)
2006	Tom Connolly (United States)	Larry Kilby (United States)	Jack Finn (United States)
2007	Andy Smith (United States)	Jim Johnson (United States)	Larry Kilby (United States)
2008	Jack Finn (United States)	Thomas Connelly (United States)	Barend de Wet (South Africa)
2009	?	?	?
2010	Jack Finn (United States)	Tom Connolly (United States)	Larry Kilby (United States)
2011	?	?	?
2012	Tom Connolly(United States)	John Bozung(United States)	Satoru Sakauchi(Japan)

===== Expert =====
Year	Winner	2nd	3rd
2003	Kensuke Goto (Japan)	Andrew Conde (United States)	Cody Taylor (United States)
2004	?	?	?
2005	Hiroyuki Suzuki (Japan)	Rob Kitts (United States)	Ben Tredway (United States)
2006	Hiroyuki Suzuki (United States)	Luke Roberts (United States)	Jake Maloney (United States)
2007	Alan Grimberg (United States)	Spencer Parsons (United States)	Will Neimeier (United States)
2008	Javier Augusto Martinez (Mexico)	Alan Grimberg (United States)	Yu-Pei Liew (Hong Kong)
2009	?	?	?
2010	Man-Fai Chan (Hong Kong)	Connor Scholten (United States)	Ian Johnson (United States)
2011	?	?	?
2012	Man Fai Chan (Hong Kong)	Man Kin Wong (Hong Kong)	Masanobu Hishida (Japan)

==== Looping ====
===== 7 to 8 =====
Year	Winner	2nd	3rd
2002	No Entry		
2003	Merged to "10 and under" division		

===== 9 to 10 =====
Year	Winner	2nd	3rd
2002	Ben Conde (United States)		
2003	Merged to "10 and under" division		

===== 10 & Under =====
Year	Winner	2nd	3rd
2003	Ben Conde (United States)	John Narum (United States)	
2004	?	?	?
2005	Tylor Mollan (United States)	Isaiah Bethell (United States)	
2006	Sean Micca (United States)	Brian Williams (United States)	Kelly Micca (United States)
2007	Tylor Mollan (United States)	Noah Gendron (United States)	Kelly Micca (United States)
2008	Bryant Baus (United States)		
2009	?	?	?
2010	No Entry		
2011	?	?	?
2012	Hajime Sakauchi(Japan)		

===== 11 to 12 =====
Year	Winner	2nd	3rd
2002	John Esfeld (United States)	Omar Acosta (United States)	
2003	No Entry		
2004	?	?	?
2005	Michael Feridco (United States)	Josef Ameur (United States)	Kieran O'Sulliva (United States)
2006	Paul Williams (United States)	Dan Dietz (United States)	Joshua Ellis (United States)
2007	Nathaniel Gendron (United States)	Nick Kozak (United States)	Theo Viola (United States)
2008	Theo Viola (United States)	Tyler Mollan (United States)	
2009	?	?	?
2010	No Entry		
2011	?	?	?
2012	No Entry		

===== 13 to 14 =====
Year	Winner	2nd	3rd
2002	Hiroyuki Suzuki (Japan)	Koichirou Mori (Japan)	Andrew Conde (United States)
2003	Merged to "13 to 16" division		

===== 15 to 16 =====
Year	Winner	2nd	3rd
2002	Tsubasa Onishi (Japan)	Rob Kitts (United States)	Dominique Vionnet (United States)
2003	Merged to "13 to 16" division		

===== 13 to 16 =====
Year	Winner	2nd	3rd
2003	Koichiro Mori (Japan)	Mike McCabe (United States)	John Esfeld (United States)
2004	?	?	?
2005	Alex Brant (United States)	Brett Stromp (United States)	
2006	Alex Kim (United States)	Alex Brandt (United States)	Spencer Parsons (United States)
2007	Mcleod Benson (United States)	Alex Brant (United States)	Chris Hawley (United States)
2008	Spencer Parsons (United States)	Andrew Ruiz (United States)	
2009	?	?	?
2010	Isaac Parris (United States)	Marshall Nye (United States)	
2011	?	?	?
2012	Nicholas Patane(United States)	Doug Kapinos(United States)	

===== 17 to 29 =====
Year	Winner	2nd	3rd
Started as "17 to 25" division
2002	Shota Aizawa (Japan)	Rob Kitts (United States)	Mina Tanikawa (United States)
Changed to "17 to 29" division
2003	Sota Tamechika (Japan)	Mina Tanikawa (United States)	Daisuke Urano (Japan)
2004	?	?	?
2005	Kengo Okubo (Japan)	Wing-Man Tse (Hong Kong)	Masanobu Hishida (Japan)
2006	Hikaru Igarashi (Japan)	Atsushi Yamada (Japan)	Pat Cuartero (United States)
2007	Patrick Mitchell (United States)	Joshua Van Dalen (Netherlands)	Masanobu Hishida (Japan)
2008	Benson McLeod (United States)	Masanobu Hishida (Japan)	Nathan Crissey (United States)
2009	?	?	?
2010	Yu Tsumura (Japan)	Kousuke Yoshida (Japan)	Naoshi Terasawa (Japan)
2011	?	?	?
2012	Sho Aketo(Japan)		

===== 30 to 44 =====
Year	Winner	2nd	3rd
Started as "26 to 45" division
2002	Dave Bazan (United States)	Tom Connoly (United States)	
Changed to "30 to 44" division
2003	Tom Connolly (United States)	Kevin Brumfield (United States)	
2004	?	?	?
2005	Isaac Kanarek (Mexico)	Ken Russell (United States)	Cole Rominger (United States)
2006	Isaac Kanarek (Mexico)	Andy Brandt (United States)	Alicia Ameur (United States)
2007	Man-Kin Wong (Hong Kong)	Isaac Kanarek (Mexico)	John Shea (United States)
2008	Man-Kin Wong (Hong Kong)	Isaac Kamarek (Mexico)	Chadd Gromaski (United States)
2009	?	?	?
2010	Kenichi Iida (Japan)	Ken Wong (United States)	Masanobu Hishida (Japan)
2011	?	?	?
2012	Isaac Kanarek(United States)		

===== 46 to 65 =====
Year	Winner	2nd	3rd
2002	Larry Kilby (United States)	John Bozung (United States)	
2003	Merged to "10 and under" division		

===== 45 & Over =====
Year	Winner	2nd	3rd
2003	Larry Kilby (United States)	John Bozung (United States)	Stuart Crump (United States)
2004	?	?	?
2005	Tom Connolly (United States)	Larry Kilby (United States)	Jack Finn (United States)
2006	Larry Kilby (United States)	Tom Connolly (United States)	Jack Finn (United States)
2007	Tom Connolly (United States)	Larry Kilby (United States)	Jack Finn (United States)
2008	Thomas Connolly (United States)	Larry Kilby (United States)	Barend de Wet (South Africa)
2009	?	?	?
2010	Tom Connolly (United States)	Larry Kilby (United States)	
2011	?	?	?
2012	Satoru Sakauchi(Japan)	Larry Kilby(United States)	Tom Connolly(United States)

===== Expert =====
Year	Winner	2nd	3rd
2003	Hiroyuki Suzuki (Japan)	Tsubasa Onishi (Japan)	Andrew Conde (United States)
2004	?	?	?
2005	Hiroyuki Suzuki (Japan)	Tsubasa Onishi (Japan)	Daisuke Simada (Japan)
2006	Hiroyuki Suzuki (Japan)	Tsubasa Onishi (Japan)	Luke Roberts (United States)
2007	Chun-Hay Chan (Hong Kong)	Atsushi Yamada (Japan)	Tsubasa Onishi (Japan)
2008	Jake Maloney (United States)	Paul Williams (United States)	
2009	?	?	?
2010	Yu Tsumura (Japan)	Kousuke Yoshida (Japan)	Kenichi Iida (Japan)
2011	?	?	?
2012	Yu Tsumura(United States)	Liu Manki(Hong Kong)	Mau Fai Chan(Hong Kong)
