= Latin American Yo-Yo Contest =

- Venue: Pabellón Polanco
- Location: Mexico City, MEX
- Start date: March 21, 2015

Latin American Yo-Yo Contest (LYYC) is the South American competition of yo-yo organized and sanctioned by the International Yo-Yo Federation (IYYF), and is one of 4 annual multi-national yo-yo competitions from which winners receive seeds to compete in the semi-finals of the annual World Yo-Yo Contest.

This event is called Campeonato Latinoamericano de Yo-yo in Spanish.

== Contests ==
LYYC had 5 title divisions, 1 non-title division, and 2 national divisions in 2015.

== History ==
There was a plan to promote the international contest for yo-yo in America continent before LYYC. Isaac Kanarek, the president of Mexican Yo-Yo Association (AMYY) tried to promote North American Yo-Yo Championship in 2010 but it had been cancelled.

In addition, Gregory Cohen the founder of World Yo-Yo Contest (WYYC) tried to promote Pan American International Yo-Yo Contest as the American Continental contest on June 30, July 1 & 2 2014 but it was also cancelled.

After International Yo-Yo Federation (IYYF) in 2013, Kanarek offered the international contest for South American nations to give Latin players chance to participate in world contest during annual meeting in 2014 WYYC Prague. His proposal was accepted. This was the start of Latin American Yo-Yo Contest.

== Participating nations ==
The 60 competitors came from 5 nations from the American continents.

=== South America ===
- Mexico
- Brazil
- Chile
- Colombia

=== North America ===
- United States

== List of champions ==
=== Latin American Category ===
==== 1A ====
Year	Winner	2nd	3rd
2015	Paul Kerbel (Mexico)	Javier Augusto Martinez (Mexico)	Luis Enrique Villasenor (Mexico)

==== 2A ====
Year	Winner	2nd	3rd
2015	Paul Kerbel (Mexico)	Salvador Ferruz (Mexico)	Santiago Torres (Mexico)

==== 3A ====
Year	Winner	2nd	3rd
2015	Patrick Borgerding (United States)	Paul Kerbel (Mexico)	Sergio Daniel Licona (Mexico)

==== 4A ====
Year	Winner	2nd	3rd
2015	Gustavo Amaral (Brazil)	Paul Kerbel (Mexico)	Javier Augusto Martinez (Mexico)

==== 5A ====
Year	Winner	2nd	3rd
2015	Betty Gallegos Gracia (Mexico)	Javier Augusto Martinez (Mexico)	Paul Kerbel (Mexico)

==== Spintop (Trompo) ====
Year	Winner	2nd	3rd
2015	Alberto Saldivar (Mexico)	Gustavo Castro (Mexico)	Pablo Garita (Mexico)

=== Mexican national category ===
==== Intermediate 1A (Intermedios) ====
Year	Winner	2nd	3rd
2015	Bernardo Figueroa (Mexico)	Luis Carlos Cuesta (Mexico)	Leon Tejed (Mexico)

==== Beginners 1A (Peincipiantes) ====
Year	Winner	2nd	3rd
2015	? (?)	? (?)	? (?)

== See also ==
- World Yo-Yo Contest
- European Yo-Yo Championship
- Asia Pacific Yo-Yo Championships
