= Asia Pacific Yo-Yo Championships =

Asia Pacific Yo-Yo Championships (AP) is Asia's most renowned and premier yo-yo competition organized by Spinworkx, a company based in Singapore since 2003. The competition has grown steadily since its inception in 2003. Spinners from around the region get to compete with current world champions, trade tips and tricks with the best in the scene, raising the standard of spinning.

== Contests ==
AP has 5 Divisions since 2011.

The 5 Divisions are 1A, 2A, 3A, 4A and 5A

1A is the single unresponsive yoyo category, players are required to use only 1 unresponsive yoyo for their performance.

2A is the double responsive yoyo category, players are required to use 2 responsive yoyos for their performance. This is also known as the hardest yo-yoing style.

3A is the double unresponsive yoyo category, players are required to use 2 unresponsive yoyos for their performance.

4A is the Off-string yoyo category, players are required to use a specially designed offstring yoyo for their performance, there are no limits to how many offstring yoyos you can use in the 4A category

5A is the Off-hand yoyo category, players are required to attach a special counter weight to a single unresponsive yoyo on the string for their performance.

== Editions ==
1. 2003: 3 events
2. 2004: 4 events
3. 2005: 4 events
4. 2006: 4 events
5. 2008: 4 events
6. 2010: 5 events
7. 2011: 5 events
8. 2012: 5 events
9. 2013: 5 events
10. 2014: 5 events
11. 2015: 5 events
12. 2016: 5 events
13. 2017: 5 events
14. 2018: 5 events
15. 2019: 5 events

== Medals (2003-2019) ==
Rank	Nation	Gold	Silver	Bronze	Total
1	Japan (JPN)	49	33	28	110
2	Singapore (SIN)	7	19	10	36
3	Philippines (PHI)	3	3	2	8
4	China (CHN)	3	2	3	8
5	Hong Kong (HKG)	2	7	11	20
6	Indonesia (INA)	2	2	1	5
7	Thailand (THA)	2	1	2	5
8	South Korea (KOR)	1	0	4	5
9	Chinese Taipei (TPE)	0	1	4	5
10	Vietnam (VIE)	0	1	1	2
11	Malaysia (MAS)	0	0	3	3
Totals (11 entries)		69	69	69	207

== Participating nations ==
The organizer let players from only Asia-Pacific region compete in all divisions.

1. Australia
2. Brunei
3. China
4. Hong Kong
5. Philippines
6. Indonesia
7. Japan
8. Vietnam
9. Macau
10. Malaysia
11. Singapore
12. Taiwan
13. Thailand
14. South Korea

== Competition Prizes ==
Prize is given competitors who won 1st to 3rd places. 500 SGD for 1st, 300 SGD for 2nd, 100 SGD for 3rd place.

== List of past champions ==
=== 1A ===
Year	Winner	2nd	3rd
2003	Hiroyuki Suzuki (Japan)	Man-Fai Chan (Hong Kong)	Chun-Hin Cheung (Hong Kong)
2004	Hiroyuki Suzuki (Japan)	Nicholas Hang (Indonesia)	Chun-Hin Cheung (Hong Kong)
2005	Hiroyuki Suzuki (Japan)	Chun-Hin Cheung (Hong Kong)	Johji Takamatsu (Japan)
2006	Hiroyuki Suzuki (Japan)	Johji Takamatsu (Japan)	Mohd Faiz (Malaysia)
2008	Hiroyuki Suzuki (Japan)	Shinya Kido (Japan)	Yi-cheng Luo (China)
2010	Hiroyuki Suzuki (Japan)	Marcus Koh (Singapore)	Shinya Kido (Japan)
2011	Christopher Chia (Singapore)	Marcus Koh (Singapore)	Hiroyuki Suzuki (Japan)
2012	Hiroyuki Suzuki (Japan)	Christopher Chia (Singapore)	Darrell Mitchell (Singapore)
2013	Ahmad Kharisma Luhur (Indonesia)	Christopher Chia (Singapore)	Hiroyuki Suzuki (Japan)
2014	Ahmad Kharisma Luhur (Indonesia)	Iori Yamaki (Japan)	Hiroyuki Suzuki (Japan)
2015	Iori Yamaki (Japan)	Ahmad Kharisma Luhur (Indonesia)	Hiroyuki Suzuki (Japan)
2016	Shion Araya (Japan)	Marcus Koh (Singapore)	Ahmad Kharisma Luhur (Indonesia)
2017	Shion Araya (Japan)	Hirotaka Akiba (Japan)	Marcus Koh (Singapore)
2018	Garbkamol Limangkul (Thailand)	Hirotaka Akiba (Japan)	Ryota Ogi (Japan)
2019	Garbkamol Limangkul (Thailand)	Hirotaka Akiba (Japan)	Kohei Nishimura (Japan)

=== 2A ===
Year	Winner	2nd	3rd
2003	Koji Yokoyama (Japan)	Hiroyuki Suzuki (Japan)	Man-Fai Chan (Hong Kong)
2004	Hiraku Fujii (Japan)	Yutaro Kasuya (Japan)	Jin-Gyu Han (South Korea)
2005	Hiraku Fujii (Japan)	Koji Yokoyama (Japan)	Man-Ki Liew (Hong Kong)
2006	Koji Yokoyama (Japan)	Shota Aizawa (Japan)	Yutaro Kasuya (Japan)
2008	Shuhei Kanai (Japan)	Masanori Jodai (Japan)	Chun-Hay Chan (Hong Kong)
2010	Shinji Saito (Japan)	Hiraku Fujii (Japan)	Masanori Jodai (Japan)
2011	Shinji Saito (Japan)	Takuma Yamamoto (Japan)	Man-Ki Liu (Hong Kong)
2012	Shunsuke Kawakami (Japan)	Siu-Ho Yiu (Hong Kong)	Wasakorn Lattilertwit (Thailand)
2013	Ginji Miura (Japan)	Atsushi Yamada (Japan)	Chun-Hay Chan (Hong Kong)
2014	Shinji Saito (Japan)	Hikaru Fujii (Japan)	Man-Ki Liu (Hong Kong)
2015	Shinji Saito (Japan)	Shu Takada (Japan)	Man-Ki Liu (Hong Kong)
2016	Man-Ki Liu (Hong Kong)	Shinji Saito (Japan)	Arata Imai (Japan)
2017	Arata Imai (Japan)	Tomoyuki Kaneko (Japan)	Yi Chenghao (China)
2018	Yi Chenghao (China)	Arata Imai (Japan)	Akira Kato (Japan)
2019	Arata Imai (Japan)	Akira Kato (Japan)	Yuki Takami (Japan)

=== 3A ===
Year	Winner	2nd	3rd
2010	Kentaro Kimura (Japan)	Taiichiro Higashi (Japan)	Takeshi Matsuura (Japan)
2011	Minato Furuta (Japan)	Takeshi Matsuura (Japan)	Taiichiro Higashi (Japan)
2012	Chak-Wing Wong (China)	Takao Morioka (Japan)	Taiichiro Higashi (Japan)
2013	Chak-Wing Wong (China)	Taiichiro Higashi (Japan)	Thawhir Iqbal (Singapore)
2014	Hajime Miura (Japan)	Thawhir Iqbal (Singapore)	Taiichiro Higashi (Japan)
2015	Taiichiro Higashi (Japan)	Mizuki Takimoto (Japan)	Thawhir Iqbal (Singapore)
2016	Taiichiro Higashi (Japan)	Yuuki Kurumisawa (Japan)	Thawhir Iqbal (Singapore)
2017	Hajime Miura (Japan)	Thawhir Iqbal (Singapore)	Taiichiro Higashi (Japan)
2018	Mizuki Takimoto (Japan)	Thawhir Iqbal (Singapore)	Yuto Yamaguchi (Japan)
2019	Thawhir Iqbal (Singapore)	Wang Yuxiang (China)	Yuto Yamaguchi (Japan)

=== 4A ===
Year	Winner	2nd	3rd
2004	Atsushi Yamada (Japan)	Lim Aik Hwee (Singapore)	Eiji Okuyama (Japan)
2005	Kin-Lok Lee (Hong Kong)	Lim Aik Hwee (Singapore)	Eiji Okuyama (Japan)
2006	Lim Aik Hwee (Singapore)	Kin-Lok Lee (Hong Kong)	Sean Perez (Philippines)
2008	Lim Aik Hwee (Singapore)	Naoto Okada (Japan)	Jung-Ting Tsao (Taiwan)
2010	Rei Iwakura (Japan)	Sean Hung (Singapore)	Po-Han Kuo (Taiwan)
2011	Tsubasa Onishi (Japan)	Rei Iwakura (Japan)	Sean Hung (Singapore)
2012	Lim Aik Hwee (Singapore)	Sean Hung (Singapore)	Yan-Ting Lam (Hong Kong)
2013	Tsubasa Onishi (Japan)	Pornpinit Sanprasert (Thailand)	Ji-Hwan Jeon (South Korea)
2014	Ji-Hwan Jeon (South Korea)	Chun-Hin Chan (Hong Kong)	Sean Hung (Singapore)
2015	Naoto Onishi (Japan)	Sean Hung (Singapore)	Zhao Chen (China)
2016	Lim Aik Hwee (Singapore)	Tsubasa Onishi (Japan)	Tomohiko Zanka (Japan)
2017	Hajime Miura (Japan)	Takumi Hakamata (Japan)	Po-Han Kuo (Taiwan)
2018	Tsubasa Takada (Japan)	Chan Chun Hin (Hong Kong)	Tomohiko Zanka (Japan)
2019	Tsubasa Takada (Japan)	Cheng Sheng-Wen (Taiwan)	Oh Jiho (South Korea)

=== 5A ===
Year	Winner	2nd	3rd
2004	Makoto Numagami (Japan)	Lim Aik Hwee (Singapore)	Andrew Lim (Singapore)
2005	Muhammad Iskandar Shah (Singapore)	Sojun Miyamura (Japan)	Hiroyasu Ishihara (Japan)
2006	Daijiro Akatsuka (Japan)	Iskandar Shah (Singapore)	Muhammad Shakeel (Malaysia)
2008	Sojun Miyamura (Japan)	Naoto Okada (Japan)	Muhammad Shakeel (Malaysia)
2010	Takeshi Matsuura (Japan)	Muhammad Iskandar Shah (Singapore)	Tsu-Chieh Lan (Taiwan)
2011	Takeshi Matsuura (Japan)	Bryan Jardin (Philippines)	Kwok-San Chan (Hong Kong)
2012	Bryan Jardin (Philippines)	Muhammad Iskandar Shah (Singapore)	Naoya Takeuchi (Japan)
2013	Bryan Jardin (Philippines)	Kwan-Ho Ko (Hong Kong)	Muhammad Iskandar Shah (Singapore)
2014	Jaued Cervas (Philippines)	'Teeny' Kai Zhang (China)	Naoya Takeuchi (Japan)
2015	Naoya Takeuchi (Japan)	Ian Loh (Singapore)	Yuttana Sukhumalchatsombat (Thailand)
2016	Hideo Ishida (Japan)	Tran Quoc Huy (Vietnam)	Ian Loh (Singapore)
2017	Yoshihiro Abe (Japan)	Miggy Hizon (Philippines)	Tran Quoc Huy (Vietnam)
2018	Yoshihiro Abe (Japan)	Hideo Ishida (Japan)	Miggy Hizon (Philippines)
2019	Yoshihiro Abe (Japan)	Miggy Hizon (Philippines)	Naoya Takeuchi (Japan)

=== X ===
Only in 2003. X was divided into 3 divisions (3A, 4A, 5A).

Year	Winner	2nd	3rd
2003	Eiji Okuyama (Japan)	Fajar Siddiq (Singapore)	Hyun-Woong Moon (South Korea)

== See also ==
- World Yo-Yo Contest
- European Yo-Yo Championship
- Latin American Yo-Yo Contest

== Asia Pacific Championships ==
- Asia-Pacific Rally Championship
- Pacific-Asia Curling Championships
- Asia-Pacific Golf Confederation
- Asia Pacific Bowls Championships
- WDF Asia-Pacific Cup
- Asia Pacific Bridge Championships - World Bridge Federation
- Asia Pacific Bowling Championships - Asian Bowling Federation
- FESPIC Games
- IIHF Women's Pacific Rim Championship
- IIHF Asian Oceanic U18 Championships
- Asia Oceania Floorball Confederation
- Pacific Rim Championships
