= Shinji Saito =

Japanese yo-yo performer (born 1989)

- Born: Saitō Shinji; June 29, 1989 (age 37); Fukushima, Japan
- Occupation: yo-yo performer

Shinji Saito (斎藤 慎司, Saitō Shinji; born June 29, 1989) is a Japanese yo-yo competitor and performer. He is a 13-time champion of the World Yo-Yo Contest, the most world titles, where he is an eight-time 2A division and a four-time CB division champion.

== Biography ==
He started practicing yo-yo in March 1998. As soon after starting yo-yo, he joined THP Japan Pro Spinners, Japanese branch of Team High Performance.

On April 5, 1998, he was certified as "Pro Spinner" who passed Hyper-level skills set by BANDAI at Toyland Fukushima.

In 2005, he scored 100 points which is a perfect score in 2A. It was the first time in the history of the World Contest for someone to earn a perfect score.

In March 2008, he graduated Fukushimakita High School.

In April 2008, he was matriculated in Faculty of Business Administration of Asia University.

== Results ==
2A
Event	2001	2002	2003	2004	2005	2006	2007	2008	2009	2010	2011	2012	2013	2014	2015	2016
World Yo-Yo Contest		1st	1st	1st	1st	1st	1st	2nd	1st		1st	1st			1st	
Asia Pacific Yo-Yo Championships										1st	1st			1st	1st	2nd
Japan National Yo-Yo Contest	1st	3rd	5th	4th					1st					6th	3rd	
East Japan Yo-Yo Contest			3rd	1st										3rd		
Tokyo Regional Yo-Yo Contest	2nd	3rd														
CB
World Yo-Yo Contest						1st	1st	1st	1st							
1A
Japan National Yo-Yo Contest				6th												
East Japan Yo-Yo Contest													2nd			
Asia Pacific Yo-Yo Championships was established in 2003. The black colored cells mean "The event was not held in that year, or it does not exist anymore."

- Other results
  - 4th Hyper Yo-Yo Japan Championships Preliminary Tohoku, Championship Division winner (1998 / BANDAI)
  - 5th Hyper Yo-Yo Japan Championships Preliminary Hokkaido, Free Style Division 3rd place (August 15, 1999 / BANDAI)
  - 5th Hyper Yo-Yo Japan Championships Final, Free Style Division 3rd place (1999 / BANDAI)
  - 6th Hyper Yo-Yo Japan Championships Preliminary Hokkaido, Free Style Division champion (August 13, 2000 / BANDAI)
  - Hyper Yo-Yo Japan Championships Final, Free Style Division 4th place (September 24, 2000 / BANDAI)
  - JYYA Yo-Yo Contest 2001, Yo-Yo Free Style Division AA champion (November 5, 2001 / JYYA)
