= Harvey Lowe =

Canadian radio presenter and yo-yo champion

- Born: Harvey Lowe; October 30, 1918; Victoria, British Columbia, Canada
- Died: March 11, 2009 (aged 90); Vancouver, British Columbia, Canada
- Occupations: Radio presenter, restaurateur
- Awards: 1932 World Yo-yo Champion
- Website: lowehk.com

Harvey Lowe (30 October 1918 – 11 March 2009) was a Canadian radio presenter and world yo-yo champion.

== Early life ==
Lowe was born in Victoria, British Columbia, Canada in 1918, the youngest of eight daughters and two sons of his parents. Wanting more male children, Lowe's father had also had a son with his concubine, making Lowe the 11th child in the family. His father died when Lowe was three and he was subsequently raised by his father's concubine while his mother supported the family by sewing. His parents maintained traditional Chinese values. His father had his hair in a queue to show support of the Qing Dynasty, and despite being born in Canada, his concubine kept her feet bound.

== Yo-yo career ==
When he was in the sixth grade, Lowe bought his first yo-yo in 1931 for 35 cents. He began entering and winning local contests in Victoria and Vancouver. Promoter Irving Cook noticed Lowe's talent and took him to London, paying his mother $25 each month and providing a tutor for him. Lowe won the first World Yo-Yo Contest at the Empire Theatre on 12 September 1932. He remained in Europe until 1934, mastering over 2000 tricks. His fame provided him with the opportunity to befriend famous people such as the Prince of Wales, Fats Waller and Laurel and Hardy. After his initial burst of fame with the toy ended, Lowe still performed regularly on local stages. Furthermore, in the 1960s, he was invited onto The Smothers Brothers Comedy Hour when Tom Smothers created his Yo-Yo Man character and appeared in a sketch as the character's guru.

In 2005 Lowe was inducted into the American Yo-Yo Association Hall of Fame. His famous yo-yo is housed in the National Yo-Yo Museum in Chico, California.

== Later career ==
On his return from Europe in 1934, Lowe entered high school. Then, in 1937, Lowe's mother sent him to Shanghai to learn the Chinese language. He went on to graduate from a Chinese university with a business degree. Lowe remained in China until Mao Zedong established the People's Republic of China in 1949, when Lowe returned to Canada.

After purchasing a typewriter, Lowe began writing about his experiences in China. The concept evolved into a weekly radio program Call of China on CJOR which ran for fourteen years.

Lowe held a variety of positions throughout his lifetime, including doorman at a gambling club, owner of the Smilin' Buddha Cabaret, stage manager at the Marco Polo and a restaurateur involved with Chinatown restaurants like the Bamboo Terrace, the Kingsland and the Asia Gardens. He also taught actress Julie Christie how to smoke opium for her role in the movie McCabe & Mrs. Miller.
