= U.S. National Yo-Yo Contest =

Final National Yo-Yo League competition

- Location: Las Vegas, Nevada, United States
- Date: October 2026

The U.S. National Yo-Yo Contest is the culminating yo-yo competition of the National Yo-Yo League (NYYL). The winner of this event in any of the five divisions is deemed the US National Yo-Yo Champion — the only event to award such a title in the United States. The winner of this competition gains the seed to the semi-final at the World Yo-Yo Contest as the United States representative. The contest has traditionally taken place in Chico, California, home to the National Yo-Yo Museum. Players qualify for the U.S. National Yo-Yo Contest through one of the several NYYL sanctioned Regional competitions. The National Yo-Yo League is the officially recognized organizing body for the United States competitive yo-yo circuit. In addition to the contest, they present US National Yo-Yo Museum awards and other honorary awards given to individuals who have contributed significantly to the yo-yo community.

== History ==
The first National Yo-Yo Contest took place in 1993. The contest has been hosted by the Bird In Hand yo-yo store, and owner Bob Malowney, in Chico, California. For many years, the contest took place in the Chico City Park.

== Current Champions ==
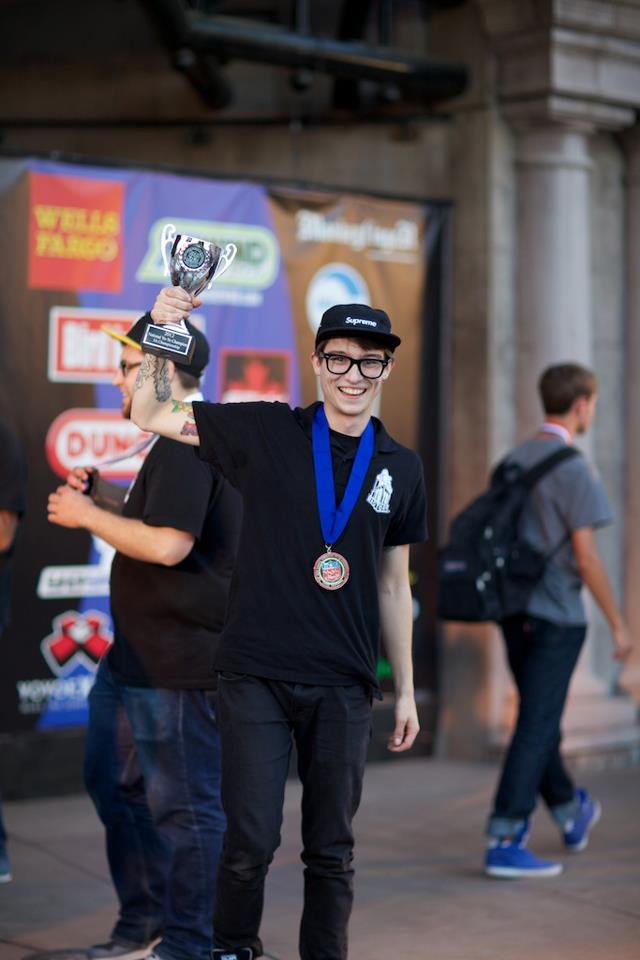
Tyler Severance holding 5A National Trophy

There are currently five U.S. National Champions. They each earn the right to represent the United States at the World Yo-Yo Contest, either in the semi-finals for 1A, or the finals for 2A-5A.

Only Zach Gormley, Yuuki Spencer, Gentry Stein, and Evan Nagao have ever won the 1A division more than once. Alex Hattori holds the record for National Titles with 10 in as many years. Shane Karan and Evan Nagao remain the only players to ever win two divisions in the same year. California has produced the most Nation Champions over the years. In 2013, Ian Johnson completed a flawless routine in the 4A division.

2026 Results
Style	Winner	2nd	3rd
1A	Thomas Rajan	Chandler Steele	Hunter Feuerstein
2A	Matt Szeto	Ryan Lai	Yoshi Mikamoto
3A	Aliyah Tan	Ian Smith	Danny Van
4A	Ryan Connolly	Josiah Pulsifer	Myles Gregory
5A	Sterling Quinn	Jared Marcus	Michael Ferdico

== Past Champions ==
Year	Style	Winner	2nd	3rd
2025	1A	Connor Seals	Chandler Steele	Hunter Feuerstein
2025	2A	Matt Szeto	Connor Scholten	Will Smith
2025	3A	Don Hodgkinson	Aliyah Tan	Ian Smith
2025	4A	Ryan Connolly	Josiah Pulsifer	Chen Zhao
2025	5A	Jared Marcus	John Wolfe	Adam Reeder
2024	1A	Justin Dauer	Connor Seals	Hunter Feuerstein
2024	2A	Matt Szeto	Cedric Mar Eusantos	Ian Smith
2024	3A	Alex Hattori	Don Hodgkinson	Aliyah Tan
2024	4A	Philip White	Ryan Connolly	Hunter Feuerstein
2024	5A	John Wolfe	Jared Marcus	Adam Reeder & Yingjie Shen (Tie)
2023	1A	Evan Nagao	Hunter Feuerstein	Connor Seals
2023	2A	Evan Nagao	Connor Scholten	John Datoy-Narum
2023	3A	Alex Hattori	Aliyah Tan	Don Hodgkinson
2023	4A	Ryan Connolly	John Datoy-Narum	Ian Johnson
2023	5A	Jared Marcus	John Wolfe	Theodore Munoz
2022	1A	Evan Nagao	Leo Chan	Hunter Feuerstein
2022	2A	John Ando	Connor Scholten	Dennis Shatter
2022	3A	Alex Hattori	Don Hodgkinson	Aliyah Tan
2022	4A	Ryan Connolly	Myles Gregory	Ian Smith
2022	5A	Jared Marcus	Ian Smith	Theodore Munoz
2019	1A	Gentry Stein	Connor Seals	Chandler Steele
2019	2A	Tyler Hsieh	Hans Yim	Yu Tsumura
2019	3A	Alex Hattori	Don Hodgkinson	Aliyah Tan
2019	4A	Ryan Connolly	Myles Gregory	Connor Seals
2019	5A	John Wolfe	Jared Marcus	Tyler Severance
2018	1A	Evan Nagao	Gentry Stein	Nathan Dailey
2018	2A	Connor Scholten	Robb Kitts	Dennis Shatter
2018	3A	Alex Hattori	Colin Beckford	Don Hodgkinson
2018	4A	Ryan Connolly	Philip White	Christopher Chunn
2018	5A	John Wolfe	Owen Ekblad	Jared Marcus
2017	1A	Evan Nagao	Gentry Stein	Michael Ferdico
2017	2A	Connor Scholten	Dennis Shatter	Josh Yee
2017	3A	Alex Hattori	Don Hodgkinson	Aliyah Tan
2017	4A	Philip White	Zac Rubino	Ian Smith
2017	5A	Josh Yee	Owen Ekblad	Jared Marcus
2016	1A	Gentry Stein	Zach Gormley	Colin Beckford
2016	2A	Joseph Harris	Connor Scholten	Yoshi Mikamoto
2016	3A	Alex Hattori	Hank Freeman	Patrick Borgerding
2016	4A	Philip White	Michael Nakamura	Zac Rubino
2016	5A	John Wolfe	Josh Yee	Anthony Rojas
2015	1A	Gentry Stein	Andrew Maider	Nathan Dailey
2015	2A	Grant Johnson	Connor Scholten	Tyler Hsieh
2015	3A	Alex Hattori	Elliot Ogawa	Don Hodgkinson
2015	4A	Philip White	Michael Nakamura	Zac Rubino
2015	5A	Jake Elliott	John Wolfe	Chase Baxter
2014	1A	Zach Gormley	Gentry Stein	Anthony Rojas
2014	2A	Joseph Harris	Connor Scholten	Benjamin McPhee
2014	3A	Alex Hattori	Patrick Borgerding	Eliot Ogawa
2014	4A	Zac Rubino	Michael Nakamura	Ian Johnson
2014	5A	Tyler Severance	Jake Elliott	Bryan Jardin
2013	1A	Gentry Stein	Anthony Rojas	Zach Gormley
2013	2A	Joseph Harris	Yoshi Mikamoto	Ian Lawson
2013	3A	Alex Hattori	Elliot Ogawa	Patrick Borgerding
2013	4A	Ian Johnson	Zac Rubino	Michael Nakamura
2013	5A	Jake Elliott	Tyler Severance	Miguel Correa
2012	1A	Zach Gormley	Gentry Stein	Harold Owens III
2012	2A	Patrick Mitchell	Joseph Harris	Connor Scholten
2012	3A	Patrick Borgerding	Don Hodgkinson	Eric Tran-Ton
2012	4A	Bryan Figueroa	Ben Conde	John Narum
2012	5A	Tyler Severance	Miguel Correa	Samm Scott
2011	1A	Harold Owens III	Anthony Rojas	Gentry Stein
2011	2A	Joseph Harris	Grant Johnson	Yu Tsumura
2011	3A	Hank Freeman	Alex Hattori	Alex Curfman
2011	4A	Bryan Figueroa	Ian Johnson	John Narum
2011	5A	Samm Scott	Tyler Severance	Miguel Correa
2010	1A	Sebastian Brock	Paul Han	John Chow
2010	2A	Grant Johnson	Patrick Mitchell	Joseph Harris
2010	3A	Hank Freeman	Patrick Borgerding	Paul Yath
2010	4A	Bryan Figueroa	Jon Martin	Connor Scholten
2010	5A	Miguel Correa	Tyler Severance	Sterling Quinn
2009	1A	Yuuki Spencer	Eric Koloski	Sebastian Brock
2009	2A	Patrick Mitchell	Joseph Harris	Grant Johnson
2009	3A	Hank Freeman	Patrick Borgerding	Paul Yath
2009	4A	Bryan Figueroa	Ian Cole	Jeff Coons
2009	5A	Miguel Correa	Sterling Quinn	Tyler Severance
2008	1A	Eric Koloski	Sebastian Brock	John Ando
2008	2A	Joseph Harris	John Ando	Adam Dennehy
2008	3A	Paul Yath	Hank Freeman	Ryan Lai
2008	4A	Bryan Figueroa	John Narum	Tsubasa Onishi
2008	5A	Miguel Correa	Sterling Quinn	Samm Scott
2007	1A	Yuuki Spencer	Eric Koloski	Paul Han
2007	2A	John Ando	Joseph Harris	Farrah Siegel
2007	3A	Kentaro Kimura	Paul Yath	Hank Freeman
2007	4A	Bryan Figueroa	Shane Karan	Sterling Quinn
2007	5A	Tyler Severance	Jake Bullock	Miguel Correa
2006	1A	Paul Han	Mark Montgomery	Augie Flash
2006	2A	John Ando	Joseph Harris	Kentaro Kimura
2006	3A	Kentaro Kimura	Paul Yath	Grant Johnson
2006	4A	Tsubasa Onishi	Jake Bullock	Jeff Coons
2006	5A	Dana Bennet	Augie Flash	Jake Bullock
2005	1A	Yuuki Spencer	Augie Flash	Mark Montgomery
2005	2A	John Ando	Patrick Mitchell	Adam Dennehy
2005	3A	Paul Yath	Kentaro Kimura	Hank Freeman
2005	4A	Tsubasa Onishi	John Narum	Yuuki Spencer
2005	5A	Jack Ringca	Augie Flash	AJ Kirk
2004	1A	Augie Flash	Paul Han	Mark Montgomery
2004	2A	John Ando	Patrick Mitchell	Masahiro Tanikawa
2004	3A	Paul Yath	Sky Kiyabu	Hank Freeman
2004	4A	Shane Karan	Cody Tayler	John Narum
2004	5A	Shane Karan	Seth Peterson	Jack Ringca
2003	1A	Johnnie DelValle	Yuuki Spencer	Brent Dellinger
2003	2A	Matt Harlow	Patrick Mitchell	Masahiro Tanikawa
2003	3A	Paul Yath	Sky Kiyabu	Mark McBride
2003	4A	Cody Tayler	Iakona Medeiros	Shane Karan
2003	5A	Miguel Correa	Felix Avellana	Jack Ringca
2002	1A	Brent Dellinger	Mark Montgomery	Yuuki Spencer
2002	2A	Matt Harlow	John Ando	Patrick Mitchell
2001	1A	Jason Lee	Brent Dellinger	Yuuki Spencer
2001	2A	Masahiro Tanikawa	Matt Harlow	Joseph Harris
2000	1A	Takumi Sakamoto	Brent Dellinger	Matt Rose
2000	2A	Alan Batangan	Joseph Harris	Matt Harlow
1999	1A	Joel Zink	Takumi Sakamoto	Nalukai HoOkano
1999	2A	Alan Batangan	Paul Han	Matt Harlow
1998	1A	Sky Kiyabu	Billy Fifield	Eric Mitz
1998	2A	Alex Garcia	Paul Han	Alan Batangan

== Championship Divisions ==
The US National Yo-Yo Contest has 5 championship divisions that award the title of 'US National Yo-Yo Champion'

Division Name	Other Name	Explanation
1A	Single Hand String Trick	The player uses a long spinning yo-yo to perform tricks that typically require manipulation of the string.
2A	Two Hands Looping Trick	The player uses two yo-yos simultaneously to perform reciprocating or looping maneuvers.
3A	Two Hands String Trick	The player uses two long spinning yo-yos and performs tricks with both simultaneously.
4A	Offstring	The player uses an offstring yo-yo, often releasing the yo-yo into the air and attempting to catch it on the string.
5A	Counterweight	The player uses a yo-yo with a counterweight on the other end of the string rather than having it attached to a finger.

=== Championship Division Structure ===
There are a series of preliminary rounds before the final round at U.S. National Yo-Yo Contest. Currently, anyone can compete at the National Yo-Yo Contest. They enter the preliminary round that consists of a one-minute routine and a set number of players would advance to the semi-finals for a 90 second routine, where yet another set number of players make the finals.There are currently three rounds of competition.

- Preliminary (1 minute)

Anyone may enter

- Semi-Final (1.5 minutes)

Top performing competitors from preliminary
2nd-5th place from each championship division in US regionals earn a seed to semi-finals

- Final (3 minutes)

Top performing competitors from semi-final
The champion of the previous year's national contest earns a seed to the finals

=== Sanctioned Seeding Competitions ===
Players can earn a seed to semi-finals through one of the NYYL sanctioned regional competitions (Competitions vary each year)

1. Bay Area Classic (BAC)
2. Pacific Northwest Regional (PNWR)
3. Southwest Regional (SWR)
4. Midwest Regional (MWR)
5. Southeast Regional (SER)
6. Mideast Regional (MER)
7. Northeast Regional (NER)
8. Mid-Atlantic Regional (MAR)
9. Rocky Mountain Regional (RMR)

== Non-Championship Divisions ==
The US National Yo-Yo Contest currently has 7 non-championship divisions that award the title of 'US National Yo-Yo Champion'

Division Name	Other Name	Explanation
Women's	N/A	A division reserved exclusively for female competitors.
Advanced Youth 1A	N/A	A single-handed division consisting of advanced young players.
Over 40	N/A	A division reserved exclusively for competitors over 40 years old.
1A International	International	A division for international players to compete at the US National Contest.
Sport 1A	Amateur	Beginner competitors in the 1A division are able to compete.
Sport X	Amateur X	Beginner competitors competing in X divisions (2A, 3A, 4A, 5A) are able to compete against each other.
Doc Lucky's Duos Division	Duos	Two competitors perform a routine together.

2026 Results
Style	Winner	2nd	3rd	4th	5th
Women's	Katie Thompson	Shterna Srugo	Kai Tyner	Maria Jones	Talia Jamison
Advanced Youth 1A	Taichi Lim	Emerson Huang	Claudio Presti	Miles Huber	Aspen Hartmann
Over 40	Adam Brewster	Howard Huang	Mark Allen	Yoshi Mikamoto	Todd Rollenhagen
1A International	Park Jun Sang	Karthik Devaraj	Shuyun Tang	Sebastian Lavin	Ryan Cooper
Sport 1A - Ages 9 & Under	YoYoCool Nicholas	Aiden Hua	Owen Ross	Reid Haydon	Logan Lau
Sport 1A - Ages 10 to 12	Connor Pflueger	Kai Levy	Oliver Browner	Ron Belyavsky	Noah Leung
Sport 1A - Ages 13 to 17	Beckham Baldwin	Bentley Gilchrist	Balam Celaya	Colin Cloyd	Jesse Lau
Sport 1A - Ages 18 & Up	Pete Filice	Tomoaki Clark	Jonas Phlox	Alex Bucsit	Max Lantos
Sport X	Harrison Breaux (4A)	Elijah Rieves (4A)	Kai Tyner (5A)	Tucker Boddy (3A)	Reese Smedley (4A)
Doc Lucky's Duos Division	Dr. Throw & the Monster - Connor Pflueger & Lucas Pflueger	CBC Light - Grayson Rhea & Annabella Rhea	The Yo-Tubers - Taichi Lim & Aspen Hartmann	Toybox Bros - Tron Spindler & Ben Thomas	Generational Swing - Nathan Boddy & Tucker Boddy
