= World Yo-Yo Contest =

Global competition

World Yo-Yo Contest by International Yo-Yo Federation (IYYF)
- Venue: Rotates annually
- Location: Europe/Asia/USA
- Dates: First Official in 2013

The World Yo-Yo Contest (WYYC) is the culminating yo-yo competition of the worldwide competitive circuit and is considered the most prestigious yo-yo competition in the world. The winner of this competition in any of the six championship divisions is deemed the World Yo-Yo Champion; the World Yo-Yo Contest is the only event to award such a title. The contest attracts competitors from all over the world and an increasingly large number of spectators. The annual competition is currently run by the International Yo-Yo Federation (IYYF) and the national organization of each year's host nation. As of 2015, 33 countries have sent competitors to the World Yo-Yo Contest from their respective national yo-yo contests. The World Yo-Yo Contest is also known as YoYoCon.

== History ==
=== Unofficial World Championship ===
1932: First held.

1933-1991: Not official and regular events. No events.

Modern Yoyo as sport since 1992.

International Jugglers' Association (IJA):

1992-1998: Montreal, Canada

1999: Hawaii, USA

2000-2012: Orlando, USA

The first World Yo-Yo Contest was held in London, England, in 1932. The winner was Harvey Lowe. However, the contest was not held annually until 1992, when Dale Oliver started one in Montreal, Canada during that year's annual International Jugglers' Association's (IJA) convention.

=== Official World Championship ===
Since 2013: Official World Championship

2013 World Yo-Yo Contest = 1st IYYF World Championship

The contest was held during this convention until 1999, when it was held in Hawaii. The 2000 contest was held at Universal Studios in Orlando, but in 2001, the event moved to the Rosen Plaza Hotel (Orlando), where it was held annually until 2013 by Gregory Cohen, owner and operator of YoYoGuy and Infinite Illusions. After the 2013 contest, an international coalition (the IYYF) was formed to organize a new, rotating contest which will be held in a different venue/country every year.

== Location ==
Following the creation of the IYYF in 2013, The World Yo-Yo Contest now cycles between America, Europe, and Asia. This cycling is scheduled through 2018. The bidding process involves the IYYF and the interested National Organization. After finals of the 2016 WYYC on day 4, Steve Brown announced a bid for the 2018 WYYC in Shanghai, China.

- 2013 World Yo-Yo Contest
- 2014 Europe (Prague, Czech Republic)
- 2015 Asia (Tokyo, Japan)
- 2016 United States of America (Cleveland, Ohio)
- 2017 Europe (Reykjavik, Iceland)
- 2018 Asia (Shanghai, China)
- 2019 United States of America (Cleveland, Ohio)
- 2023 Asia (Osaka, Japan)
- 2024 United States of America (Cleveland, Ohio)
- 2025 Europe (Prague, Czech Republic)

=== Online World Yo-Yo Contest ===
Prior to the COVID-19 pandemic, the 2020 World Yo-Yo Contest was slated to be held in Budapest, Hungary. The pandemic, however, caused organizers to cancel the 2020 competition. In 2021 and 2022, to mitigate the possibility of attendees getting sick, the Online World Yo-Yo Contest was created, giving prospective World Yo-Yo Contest competitors the opportunity to compete in an online setting. The results of the 2021 online competition are given below.

| Style | Winner | 2nd | 3rd |
|---|---|---|---|
| 1A | Kim Mir (South Korea) | Akitoshi Tokubuchi (Japan) | Park Junsang (South Korea) |
| 2A | Shu Takada (Japan) | Satoshi Yamanaka (Japan) | Wasakorn Lattilertwit (Thailand) |
| 3A | Minato Furuta (Japan) | Tomoya Kurita (Japan) | Mizuki Takimoto (Japan) |
| 4A | Kaoru Nakamura (Japan) | Tsubasa Onishi (Japan) | Yuki Uchida (Japan) |
| 5A | Sora Ishikawa (Japan) | Yoshihiro Abe (Japan) | Hideo Ishida (Japan) |
| Women's | Kim Mi-ri (South Korea) | Veronika Kamenská (Czech Republic) | Hobbit Xiao-Wen Wang (Taiwan) |
| Over 40 | Ricardo Marechal (Brazil) | Benjamin McPhee (USA) | Tomomi Matsuda (Japan) |

There was also an artistic performance division (AP), in which two awards were given. The Entertainment Award went to YOYOBOYS (Robert Kučera & Zdenek Hybl) and the Artistic Award went to Naoto Okada.

The winners of the Online World Yo-Yo Contest do not gain the title of World Yo-Yo Champion, however. The title they receive is that of Online World Yo-Yo Champion (in their respective divisions).

The winners of the 2022 Online World Yo-Yo Contest are below.

| Style | Winner | 2nd | 3rd | 4th |
|---|---|---|---|---|
| 1A | Mir Kim | Akitoshi Tokubuchi | Junsang Park | Ryuichi Nakamura |
| 2A | Hiraku Fujii | Hajime Sakauchi | Arata Imai | Akira Kato |
| 3A | Tomoya Kurita | Minato Furuta | Dongyoung Kim | Thawhir Iqbal |
| 4A | Kaoru Nakamura | Gunju Eom | Tomohiko Zanka | Taiyo Katsumata |
| 5A | Sora Ishikawa | Jihoo Lee | Yuki Sakamoto | Naoya Takeuchi |
| Women's | Miri Kim | Xueqing Yang | Ziyu Meng | Kira Morrow |
| Over 40 | Lorenzo Sabatini | Ricardo Marechal | Tomoya Isoshima | Tomomi Matsuda |

== Current champions ==
As mentioned above, the World Yo-Yo Contest did not take place in 2020, 2021, or 2022. In 2021 and 2022, the Online World Yo-Yo Contest was held in its place, the champions thereof receiving the title of Online World Yo-Yo Champion (as opposed to World Yo-Yo Champion). The World Yo-Yo Contest returned in 2023, when the competition was held in Osaka, Japan. The 2024 World Yo-Yo Contest was held from July 31 to August 3, in Cleveland, Ohio. In 2025, from August 7-10, the contest was held in Prague, Czech Republic. In 2026, the contest was held from August 13-16 in Himeji, Japan. The results of said competition are given below.

| Style | Winner | 2nd | 3rd |
|---|---|---|---|
| 1A | Mir Kim (South Korea) | Jakub Dolejs (Czechia) | Hunter Feuerstein (USA) |
| 2A | Chun Hay Chan (Hong Kong) | Man Ki Liu (Hong Kong) | Hajime Sakauchi (Japan) |
| 3A | Tomoya Kurita (Japan) | Jiho Oh (South Korea) | Minato Furuta (Japan) |
| 4A | Kyoto Hashimoto (Japan) | Hong Lun Chang (Taiwan) | Haobo Liu (China) |
| 5A | Jihoo Lee (South Korea) | Shigehiro Yamada (Japan) | Sora Ishikawa (Japan) |

List of past World Yo-Yo Champions

== Winners by country and players (1993-2013 Unofficial World Championship) ==
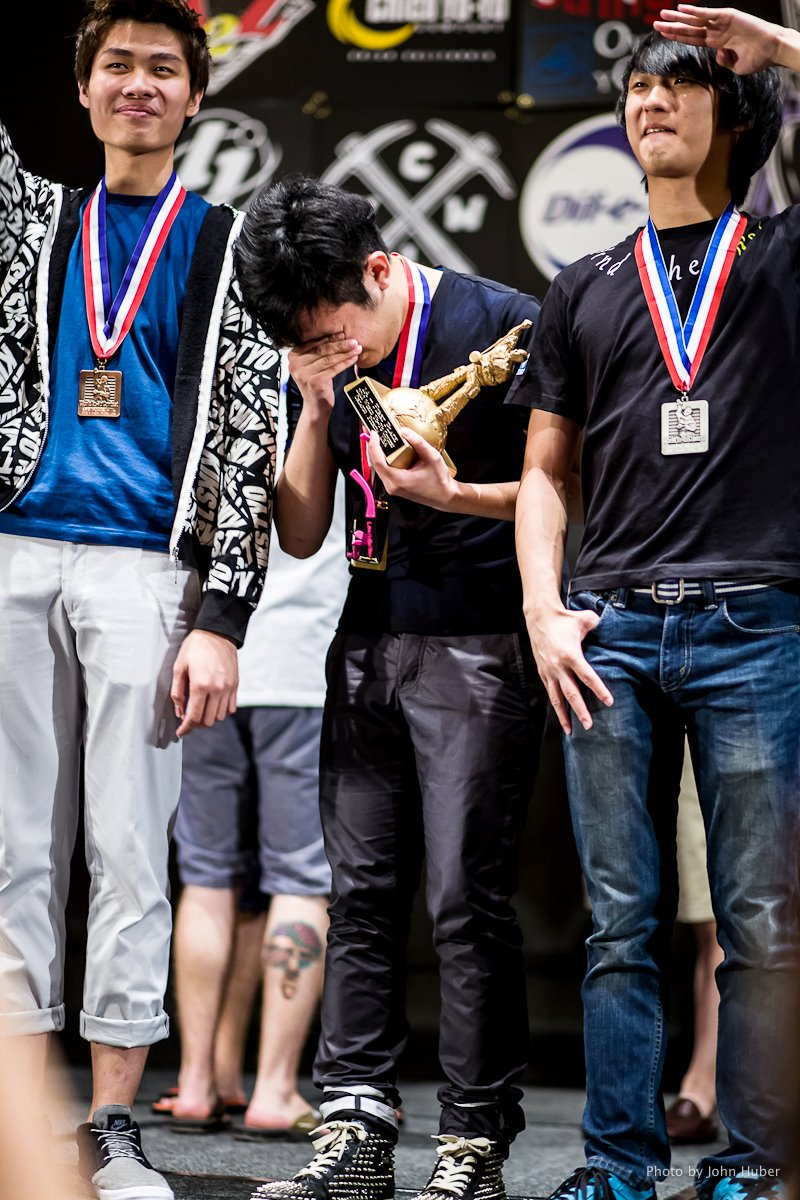
Hiroyuki Suzuki of Japan winning his fourth World Title in 2012. He also won in 2004, 2005, and 2006.

The World Yo-Yo Contest has historically been dominated by the Japanese-taking home 85 World Titles in the past 22 years. The United States has also had a lesser dominance, taking home 27 World Titles.

Shinji Saito remains the most decorated yo-yoer of all-time with 13 World Titles. Hajime Miura is second with 9 World Titles to his name.

| Country | Gold | Silver | Bronze |
|---|---|---|---|
| Japan | 80 | 75 | 67 |
| USA | 27 | 28 | 31 |
| Brazil | 1 | 1 | |
| Canada | 1 | | |
| Singapore | 1 | 2 | 2 |
| Hungary | 1 | | |
| Switzerland | 2 | | |
| Hong Kong | 1 | 2 | 1 |
| Taiwan | 1 | 2 | 1 |
| Germany | | | 2 |
| Mexico | | | 1 |

=== Historical notes ===
==== World Yo-Yo Contest (2000-2012) ====
In 2003, Brazil's Rafael Matsunaga became the first player outside Japan or the United States to win a World Title, doing so in 5A (Counterweight). In 2004, Hiroyuki Suzuki won his first World Title. Both Daisuke Shimada and Shinji Saito won their third World Title in as many years. Hiroyuki Suzuki became the first player to ever win back-to-back titles in the 1A division in 2005. Shinji Saito continued his dominance, winning his fourth World Title in the 2A division. Kentaro Kimura won the 3A division with what is considered the greatest 3A routine of all time in 2009. In 2010, Canada's Jensen Kimmitt became the first player outside Japan or the United States to win a World Title in 1A. Without Shinji Saito entering the 2A division, Yashushi Furakawa won the World Title. Singapore's Marcus Koh became the second player outside of the United States or Japan to win in the 1A division when he won in 2011. Shinji Saito also returned from a year competition hiatus to win the 2A division for a record eighth time. In 2012, Switzerland's inmot!on became the first team outside Japan or the United States to win the Artistic Performance (AP) division. It was also the first ever World Title won by European competitors.

==== IYYF World Yo-Yo Contest (Post-2013) ====
In 2013, Hungary's Janos Karancz became the first European to win the 1A division at the 2013 World Yo-Yo Contest. 2013 was also the first, and only, year to feature a top-3 in 1A with no players from Japan or the United States. In 2014, Rei Iwakura completed a flawless routine in the 4A division en route to his third World Title.

In 2018, Hajime Miura won both the 3A and 4A division (the latter, competing from the wild card stage), making him the first and only player to ever win two major style divisions (1A, 2A, 3A, 4A and 5A) in the same year. Notably, until 2024, he was the only player in history to have more World Titles than appearances at Worlds. He would win the 3A World Title again in 2019 but would get his first ever non-1st place in the 4A division, where he performed a full 3-minute soloham routine, placing 7th.

Mir Kim won the 1A division in both Online World Yo-Yo Contests and won again in the 2023 and 2024 World Yo-Yo Contests. He was the first player from South Korea to win a 1A World Title, and also had the highest scoring 1A freestyle ever in 2023, with a final score of 99.7/100.

2024 was the first year Hajime Miura competed in the World Yo-Yo Championship and did not win at least one World Title, coming fourth in the 3A final due to major deductions. Miri Kim was the first female competitor to appear in Open Division 1A Finals since Kahli Evans in 2008, placing 13th. 2024 was the first year since 2013 to feature a top-3 in 1A with no players from Japan.

== Championship divisions ==
The World Yo-Yo Contest has 6 championship divisions that award the title of 'World Yo-Yo Champion'

| Division name | Other name | Explanation |
|---|---|---|
| 1A | Single Hand String Trick | The player uses a long spinning yo-yo to perform "string tricks" that typically require manipulation of the string. |
| 2A | Two Hands Looping Trick | The player uses two responsive yo-yos simultaneously to perform reciprocating or looping maneuvers. |
| 3A | Two Hands String Trick | The player uses two long spinning yo-yos and performs tricks with both simultaneously. |
| 4A | Offstring | The player uses an offstring yo-yo, often releasing the yo-yo into the air and attempting to catch it on the string. |
| 5A | Counterweight | The player uses a yo-yo with a counterweight on the other end of the string rather than having it attached to a finger. |
| AP | Artistic Performance | The performer uses any type of yo-yo or other prop for an open-ended performance which emphasizes choreography and stage presence. |

=== Championship division structure ===
There are a series of preliminary rounds before the final round at the World Yo-Yo Contest. In the past, anyone could enter the World Yo-Yo Contest. Competitors were allowed a one-minute routine, and a set number of players would make the finals. The preliminary rounds have been evolving over the years to accommodate the growing popularity of competitive yo-yos around the world.

In the 1A division, there are currently four rounds of competition. In 2A-5A, there is currently only the Preliminary (1 minute) and the Final (3 minute).

- Wild-Card (30 seconds)

Any player can enter the Wild-Card round

- Preliminary (1 minute)

Top-10 at a sanctioned National Competition/Multi-National Competition seeded directly to Preliminary
Top performing competitors from Wild-Card

- Semi-Final (1:30 minutes)

Top-3 at sanctioned Multi-National Competition & sanctioned National Champions seeded directly to Semi-Final
Top performing competitors from Preliminary

- Final (3 minutes)

Previous Year's World Champion seeded directly to Final

=== Sanctioned seeding competitions ===
Players can earn a seed to various rounds of the preliminaries through multi-national competitions, national competitions, and the previous year's World Yo-Yo Contest.

1. European Yo-Yo Championship (Kraków, Poland)
2. Las Vegas Yo-Yo Championship (Las Vegas, United States)
3. Asia Pacific Yo-Yo Championship (Singapore, Singapore)
4. Latin American Yo-Yo Contest (Mexico City, Mexico)
5. Previous year's World Yo-Yo Contest (No specific location)
6. One of 33 IYYF approved National Competitions

== Defunct divisions ==
The World Yo-Yo Contest has also held other championship divisions that are now defunct either because it was replaced or had judging standardization issues.

| Division name | Other name | Year | Note |
|---|---|---|---|
| TM | Team | 1999–2001 | |
| MT | Mega Team | 1999 | |
| X | | 2000–2002 | Included all tricks and styles not eligible for 1A and 2A. In 2003, it was separated into 3A, 4A and 5A divisions. |
| CB | Combined | 2006–2009 | Players compete and demonstrate skill in multiple styles. Due to difficulties with judging, this division was removed. Shinji Saito was the winner all four years it was held. |

== Non-championship divisions ==
In addition to these World Divisions, the World Yo-Yo Contest also hosts additional divisions such as the 'Women's Division' and, in 2015, the 'Over 40 Freestyle'. There is also numerous yo-yo modifying and design contests, known in the field as modding. These non-championships divisions do not award the title of 'World Yo-Yo Champion'.

| Division Name | Other Name | Explanation |
|---|---|---|
Yo-Yo
| WF | Women's Freestyle | Women freestyle for 2-minutes. They can enter both Women's and Open. |
| Over 40 | Over 40 Freestyle | Men and Women over 40 freestyle for 2-minutes. They can enter both 'Over 40' and Open. |
Diabolo
| DL | Diabolo Ladder | |
| DF | Diabolo Freestyle | |
Sports
| SL | Sports Ladder | |
| SF | Sports Freestyle | |
Spintop
| SL | Spintop Ladder | |
| SF | Spintop Freestyle | This is a World Title as certified by ITSA but not a yo-yo division title. |
Mod
| MD | Mod | The player produces and designs a self-made yo-yo. |

== Participating nations ==
There are 33 countries currently registered with the IYYF that have the right to seed a National Champion into the semi-final round at the World Yo-Yo Contest. IYYF is also in communication with several other countries (denoted by *), but, currently, these countries do not have the right to seed a National Champion to the semi-finals.

=== Europe ===
- Czech Republic
- France
- Slovakia
- Spain
- Germany
- Italy
- Hungary
- Austria
- Greece
- Finland
- Poland
- Russia
- Israel
- Bulgaria
- United Kingdom
- Switzerland
- Turkey *
- Iceland *
- Denmark *
- Ireland *
- Norway *
- Netherlands *

=== North America ===
- United States
- Mexico
- Canada

=== Asia/Oceania ===
- Japan
- Australia
- New Zealand
- Brunei
- South Korea
- Malaysia
- Hong Kong
- China
- Taiwan
- Thailand
- Vietnam
- Singapore
- Philippines
- Indonesia
- India *
- UAE *
- Pakistan *
- Bangladesh *
- Kazakhstan *

=== Africa ===
- South Africa *
- Morocco *

=== South America ===
- Brazil
- Chile *
- Venezuela *
- Colombia *
