= Hero (disambiguation) =

A hero is somebody who performs great and noble deeds of bravery.

Hero may also refer to:

== People ==
- Hero of Alexandria (c. 10–70 AD), ancient Greek mathematician and engineer
- Hero (given name), including a list of people with the given name
- Hero (singer) (Kim Jaejoong, born 1986), South Korean singer
- Justin Cassell (fl. 1950s), known as Hero, Montserratian calypso musician
- Oleg Penkovsky (1919–1963), codename Hero, Soviet double agent
- Hero of Byzantium, mid-10th century Byzantine author

== Arts, entertainment and media ==
=== Fictional characters ===
- Protagonist, sometimes called hero, the main character in a story
- Hero, priestess of Aphrodite in the Greek myth of Hero and Leander
  - And in Hero and Leander (poem) by Christopher Marlowe
  - And in Hero and Leander (1819 poem) by Leigh Hunt
- Hero, in the 1962 musical A Funny Thing Happened on the Way to the Forum
- Hero or Shen, in Dragon Ball
- Hero, the protagonists of the Dragon Quest series
  - Hero (Dragon Quest III)
  - Hero (Dragon Quest IV)
  - Hero (Dragon Quest V)
- Hero (Much Ado About Nothing), in Shakespeare's play
- Hero, a horse of comic character Phantom
- Hero, a name of comic book character the Forgotten One
- Hero, in the video game Quest for Glory
- Captain Hero, in TV series Drawn Together
- Hero Brown, in the comic book series Y: The Last Man
- Hero Cruz, a DC comics character
- HERO, a character in the 2020 role-playing video game Omori
- Hiro Protagonist, the main character in Neal Stephenson's 1992 novel Snow Crash

=== Film and television ===
==== Films ====
- Hero (1982 film), a British adventure-fantasy film
- Hero (1983 film), a Hindi romantic action film
- Hero (1984 film), a Telugu film
- Hero (1985 film), a Pakistani Urdu action-romance musical
- Hero (1987 film), a British documentary about the 1986 FIFA World Cup
- Hero (1992 film), an American comedy drama
- Hero – Beyond the Boundary of Time, a 1993 Hong Kong comedy
- Hero (1997 film), a Hong Kong martial arts film
- Hero (2000 film), an American short film
- Hero (2002 film), a Chinese wuxia film
- Hero (2006 film), a Bengali-language action comedy
- Hero (2007 film), a Japanese film based on the TV series
- Hero: The Real Hero, Malayalam dubbed version of the 2007 Telugu film Desamuduru
- Hero (2008 film), a Telugu-language action comedy
- Hero: The Action Man, Hindi dubbed version of the 2011 Telugu film Bejawada
- Hero (2012 film), a Malayalam-language action comedy thriller
- Hero: The Superstar, a 2014 Bangladeshi action comedy, featuring Shakib Khan
- Hero (2015 Hindi film), a remake of the 1983 Hindi film
- Hero (2015 Japanese film), based on the TV series
- Hero (2019 Tamil film), a superhero film
- Hero (2019 Russian film), a spy action comedy
- Hero (2021 film), a Kannada-language action film
- Hero (2022 Indian film), a Telugu-language action film
- Hero (2022 Chinese film), a Chinese-language drama
- Hero (2022 South Korean film), a Korean-language drama
- Hero, an animated short film promoting the Overwatch game

==== Television ====
- "Hero" (Angel), a 1999 episode
- Hero (2001 TV series), a Japanese drama
- Hero – Bhakti Hi Shakti Hai, 2005 Indian superhero series
- "Hero", a 2005 episode from Ultraman Nexus
- "Hero" (Battlestar Galactica), a 2006 episode
- "Hero" (Smallville), a 2008 episode
- "Hero" (The Unit), a 2009 episode
- "Hero" (Sanctuary)", a 2009 episode
- Hero (2009 TV series), a South Korean action comedy
- "Hero" (Better Call Saul), a 2015 episode
- Hero (2016 TV series), a Singaporean drama

=== Gaming ===
- Hero (board game), 1980
- H.E.R.O. (video game), 1984
- Hero Online, a 2006 online roleplaying game
- Hero shooter, a sub-genre of shooter games
- Hero Games, Role Playing Game publisher
  - Hero System, generic roleplaying game system published by Hero Games

=== Literature ===
- Hero (magazine), an American LGBT magazine 1997–2002
- Hero Illustrated, a mid-1990s American comic book-themed magazine
- H.E.R.O. (comics), 2003 American comic book series
- Hero (novel), 2007, by Perry Moore
- Hero (British magazine), a men's fashion and lifestyle magazine from 2009
- HERO, a graphic novel series by Yoshitaka Amano

=== Music ===
==== Albums ====
- Hero (John Paul Young album), 1975
- Hero (Clarence Clemons album), 1985
- Hero (Divinefire album), 2005
- Hero (Kirk Franklin album), 2005
- Hero (Charlotte Perrelli album), 2008
- Hero (van Canto album), 2008
- Hero (Super Junior album), 2013
- Hero (Bölzer album), 2016
- Hero (Maren Morris album), 2016

==== Opera and musicals ====
- Hero (musical), a 1976 rock musical
- !Hero, a 2003 rock opera

==== Songs ====
- "Hero", by Neu! from Neu! '75, 1975
- "Hero", a 1983 version of "Wind Beneath My Wings" recorded by Gladys Knight & The Pips
- "Hero", from Meltdown (Steve Taylor album), 1984
- "Hero", from ΚΕΦΑΛΗΞΘ by Ministry, 1992
- "Hero" (David Crosby song), 1993
- "Hero" (Mariah Carey song), 1993
- "Hero", by Linnéa Handberg Lund, 1998
- "Hero", by Ozzy Osbourne from No Rest for the Wicked, 1998
- "Hero" (The Verve Pipe song), 1999
- "Hero" (Enrique Iglesias song), 2001
- "Hero", by Darren Hayes from The Tension and the Spark, 2001
- "Hero", by Machinae Supremacy, 2001
- "Hero" (Chad Kroeger song), 2002
- "Hero", 2002, from the film by Faye Wong
- "Hero", by Superchick from Last One Picked, 2002
- "Hero", by Nightrage from Sweet Vengeance, 2003
- "Hero" (Europe song), 2004
- "Eiyuu" (英雄) (translated "Hero") by doa (Japanese band), 2004
- "Hero", by Bethany Dillon from Music Inspired by The Chronicles of Narnia: The Lion, the Witch and the Wardrobe, 2005
- "Hero", by Sevendust from Next, 2005
- "Hero", by Regina Spektor from Begin to Hope, 2006
- "Hero", by Zion I & The Grouch from Heroes in the City of Dope, 2006
- "Hero/Heroine", 2007, by Boys Like Girls
- "Hero" (Charlotte Perrelli song), 2008
- "Hero" (Nas song), 2008
- "Hero", by Younha from Someday, 2008
- "Hero", from The Night Before (James album), 2008
- "Hero" (Skillet song), 2009
- "Hero", by Cassie Davis, from Differently, 2009
- "Hero", by Jars of Clay from The Long Fall Back to Earth, 2009
- "Hero", by Sterling Knight from Starstruck (2010 film)
- "Hero", by Childish Gambino from Culdesac, 2010
- "Hero", from Pulse (Toni Braxton album), 2010
- "Hero / Sweet Jewel", by Fairies, 2011
- "Hero" (Family of the Year song), 2012
- "Hero", by Jessie J from Kick-Ass 2 soundtrack, 2013
- "Hero (Kibō no Uta)", a version of "Cha-La Head-Cha-La" by Flow, 2013
- "Hero", by Kid Cudi and Skylar Grey from the Need for Speed film soundtrack, 2014
- "Hero" (Noah song), 2014
- "Hero", by Jay Chou from Jay Chou's Bedtime Stories, 2016
- "Hero" (Namie Amuro song), 2016
- "Hero", by Cash Cash featuring Christina Perri, from Blood, Sweat & 3 Years, 2016
- "Hero", from Headspace (Issues album), 2016
- "Hero", by the Newsboys from Love Riot, 2016
- "Hero", by Monsta X, 2017
- "Hero", from Lionheart (Serenity album), 2017
- "Hero", by Sevdaliza from ISON, 2017
- "Hero" (Weezer song), 2020
- "Hero", by Royce da 5'9" from The Allegory, 2020
- "Hero", by Lucy, 2021
- "Hero" (Afrojack and David Guetta song), 2021
- "Hero" (Alan Walker song), 2023
- "Hero", by Charlie Puth, 2024
- "Hero", by Mili for video game Limbus Company, 2024

== Media ==
- Hero (TV channel), a former pay TV channel in the Philippines
- Hero (Finnish TV channel), a Finnish television channel

== Businesses and organisations ==
- Hero Certified Burgers, a Canadian restaurant chain
- Hero Motors Company, an Indian company group
  - Hero Cycles, an Indian bicycle manufacturer
  - Hero MotoCorp, formerly Hero Honda, an Indian motorcycle manufacturer
  - Hero Motors, a former Indian moped and scooter manufacturer
- Hero Group, a Swiss food company
- Hero (supermarket), a retail chain in Indonesia
- Hero Tires, a brand of Federal Corporation
- Shanghai Hero Pen Company, Chinese manufacturer of the Hero fountain pen
- Highway Emergency Response Operators, in Georgia, U.S.

== Mythology ==
- Hero, the general concept
- Hero (Greece), the mortal offspring of a human and a god, or a man more than human but less than a god
- Hero, priestess of Aphrodite in the Greek myth of Hero and Leander
- Hero (son of Priam), one of the sons of king Priam

== Science and technology ==
- Hero (gastropod), a genus in the family Heroidae
- HERO (robot), a series of 1980s educational robots
- HTC Hero, a smartphone
- HERO camera series by GoPro
- High-Energy Replicated Optics, a high-altitude X-ray telescope
- Hyper extremely red objects, astronomical sources of radiation with extreme redshift

== Transportation and military ==
- Hero (pinnace), a steam-powered boat, launched 1895
- Hero (1807 ship), a British whaler
- Hero (sloop), which explored the Antarctic in 1820
- Hero-class patrol vessels, nine ships of the Canadian Coast Guard
- RV Hero, Antarctic research vessel, 1968–2017
- HMS Hero, several ships of the Royal Navy
- Hero, a South Devon Railway Dido class locomotive
- Hamilton-class cutter of the U.S. Coast Guard, some of which are known as "Hero class"
- Hero, loitering munition systems by UVision Air

== Other uses ==
- Hero (title), presented by governments to their citizens for great achievements
- Hero, a roller coaster at Flamingo Land Resort in Yorkshire, England
- Hero (sandwich), a New York name for a submarine sandwich
- Houston Equal Rights Ordinance, or 2015 Houston, Texas Proposition 1
- North Hero, Vermont, a town in the US

== See also ==
- Heroes (disambiguation)
- Heros (disambiguation)
- Heroic (disambiguation)
- Heroine (disambiguation)
- Herro, given name and surname
- Herrö (disambiguation)
- Hiro (disambiguation)
- The Hero (disambiguation)
- The Heroes (disambiguation)
- Superhero (disambiguation)
- Antihero
- Hero's, a Japanese mixed martial arts promotion
- Nayak (disambiguation) (lit. 'Hero' in Indic languages)
- 英雄 (disambiguation)
