= Bill Curtsinger =

American underwater photographer

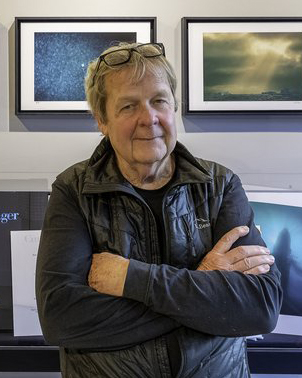
- Curtsinger, c. 2021
- Born: 1946 (age 79–80); Philadelphia, Pennsylvania, U.S.
- Other name: William R. Curtsinger
- Citizenship: American
- Education: Northern Arizona University; Arizona State University
- Occupations: Photographer; Author
- Years active: 1967–Present
- Employers: National Geographic (1970–2003); Freelance (1967–Present)
- Known for: Underwater photography
- Awards: NSTA recognition (2002); NOGI Award (2006)
- Military career
- Branch: United States Navy
- years: 1967–1970
- Rank: Petty officer second class
- Unit: Combat Camera Group Atlantic Fleet
- Known for: First color cover page in Naval Aviation News
- Assignments: Fighter Squadron VF-11; Operation Deep Freeze
- Awards: National Defense Service Medal; Antarctica Service Medal
- Website: www.billcurtsinger.com

Bill Curtsinger is an American photographer and writer who publishes on underwater photography and natural history subjects. Curtsinger has photographed thirty-five articles, including six cover stories for National Geographic and a cover story for Life. His photos have also appeared in Smithsonian, Natural History, various scientific journals, and a number of books worldwide.

== Early life and education ==
Curtsinger was born in Philadelphia, Pennsylvania, in 1946 and grew up in Mount Holly, New Jersey near the Pine Barrens region. In later life, he provided photographic images for a book about the sprawling ecosystem at the barrens.

As a teenager, Curtsinger was inspired to photograph the underwater arena by reading Jacques Cousteau's book The Silent World: A Story of Undersea Discovery and Adventure. Cousteau was an award-winning underwater diver who captured exotic underwater videos and photos. Curtsinger also read his grandfather's National Geographic magazines for additional inspiration.

Further inspiration as a teenager would come in the form of a poem by Robinson Jeffers.

...Integrity is wholeness, the greatest beauty is organic wholeness, the wholeness of life and things, the divine beauty of the universe. Love that...

— Robinson Jeffers, The Answer

At the age of 16, Curtsinger bought his first camera, a Kodak Retinette 1A 35mm rangefinder. The first image he took was a Northern red-bellied turtle at Pine Barrens.

== U.S. Navy career ==
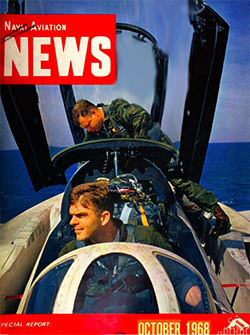
Curtsinger captured the first color photo on the cover of Naval Aviation News (1968).

During the Vietnam War, in 1967 after graduating high school at 18, Curtsinger attended Northern Arizona University in Flagstaff. After a year he transferred to Arizona State University in Tempe to join their photography program. During the transfer of schools he lost course credits and was deemed a second-year freshman. Because of this, the draft board reclassified him, making him eligible to be drafted into the Vietnam War effort. Curtsinger preemptively joined the United States Navy to circumvent being drafted into the United States Army.

Due to his interest in photography, the Navy excepted Curtsinger into the elite Navy Photo Unit, Atlantic Fleet Combat Camera Group based at Naval Station Norfolk. The camera unit was disestablished in 2018.

After graduating from U.S. Navy Dive School in Key West, Florida, curtsinger earned his Jump Wings in Lakehurst, New Jersey, and attended various U.S. Navy Flight Crew training units around Norfolk, Virginia. He traveled the world on special assignments for the United States Fleet Forces Command of the Atlantic Fleet, including the Navy's research and development department photographing new launches of submarines, such as the USS Narwhal (SSN-671).

Curtsinger spent most of his Navy career covering the United States Navy carrier air operations. He qualified to fly in the F-4 Phantom and A-6 Intruder to carry out his photo missions. He was made an honorary member of the Red Rippers, U.S. Navy Fighter Squadron VF-11, and is credited as having the first color front and back covers in Naval Aviation News (1968).

As a Petty officer third class in 1968 Curtsinger was sent to Antarctica to photograph the National Science Foundation's Office of Polar Programs at McMurdo Station as part of Operation Deep Freeze, and in 1969 to Palmer Station, for which he was awarded the Antarctica Service Medal.

After six months in the Antarctic, Curtsinger approached Admiral George J. Dufek (Ret.), who at the time was the director of the Mariner's Museum in Newport News, Virginia, and knew of his work with Naval Aviation News and Antarctic Science. Dufek led the first U.S. science effort in the Antarctic during Operation Highjump. Curtsinger has stated that during a conversation with Dufek, he made a call to Gilbert M. Grosvenor, President of the National Geographic Society to set up a meeting to meet with Curtsinger.

In 1970 Curtsinger was transferred to the United States Navy Reserve as a Petty officer second class, where he served until 1973, resigning to pursue freelance photography for National Geographic.

== Freelance career ==
Curtsinger in front of a large print of his February 1994 cover on National Geographic, showcasing a long exposure of a sea turtle underwater. c. 2023

Curtsinger is one of the first underwater photographers to capture extensive images of marine life under the polar ice in Antarctica. He had been a freelance photographer since leaving the U.S. Navy with his photographic imagery focusing on underwater, natural history, maritime archaeology, people, culture, environments and wildlife. He has photographed thirty-three articles, including six cover stories, for National Geographic. Curtsinger's photos have also appeared on the cover of Orion, Life and Natural History magazines with stories in a number of other magazines such as BBC Wildlife and Smithsonian.

The subjects of Curtsinger's photographs have included species and natural systems such as whales, walruses, penguins, dolphins, seals, sea turtles and sharks. His stories have featured locations such as Antarctica, Canada, Argentina, Africa and The Caroline Islands of the tropical Pacific.

Curtsinger's work also includes numerous textbooks, journals and aquarium displays and he has been a contributor to Gulf of Maine Research Institute publications and website. He has eight titled published books including Extreme Nature: Images from the World's Edge, a four hundred page retrospective of his career, published in 2005 by White Star Publishers in nine languages.

Curtsinger has stated that he pitched his first assignment with National Geographic to Bob Gilka because he knew the magazine had not published any articles about the peninsula. Having spent six months in the cold barren landscape of Antarctica he knew that the peninsula was more interesting and more biological diverse than what was previously published in the Geographic. His very first article was a cover story in the November 1971 issue of National Geographic, "Antarctica's Nearer Side" by Samuel W. Matthews.

With his crisp, clean photos of whales, seals, penguins, and dolphins, ex-Navy photographer Bill Curtsinger helped the National Geographic Society pioneer the field of underwater marine life photography with stunning pictures such as this shot of an Emperor penguin gliding through the waters of McMurdo Sound, Antarctica.

— National Geographic Society

=== Grey reef shark ===
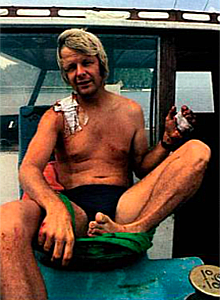
Curtsinger after an encounter with a Grey reef shark. c. 1973

In January 1995 National Geographic published an article photographed and written by Curtsinger about grey reef sharks. In a subsection of the story, he reminisces about a 1973 encounter with the same species of sharks in the Micronesian lagoon in the Caroline Islands.

The shark came at me like a rocket. I had time only to lift my hand...(The shark then) raked my right shoulder. At that moment a friend rescued me in a dingy.

— Curtsinger, Bill National Geographic

After this encounter he only needed minor reconstructive surgery to his hand and shoulder. He has stated that grey reef sharks are extremely territorial, suspect in many attacks on indigenous islanders throughout Oceania and was most likely driving away a perceived competitor or predator.

=== Shipwrecks ===
Curtsinger has also photographed many shipwrecks throughout his career, like the Mary Rose at Portsmouth Harbour, which was active during the reign of Henry the VIII. He has also photographed the 16th century Basque whaling ship off the coast of Labrador, the 17th century Swedish warship Kronan that sank in the Baltic Sea off the Swedish island of Öland and a 14th-century Bronze Age merchant ship, which was the oldest known shipwreck at that time (1987).

In 1991 he captured the sunken fleet of Operation Crossroads at Bikini Atoll in the Marshall Islands. Operation Crossroads was a classified undertaking by the U.S. military to test nuclear weapons underwater in 1946. National Geographic ran a story about the underwater wreckage in their June 1992 issue authored by John L. Elliot and photographed by Curtsinger. Also, a scientific journal was published for the United States Department of the Interior, The Archeology of the Atomic Bomb, featuring select images from Curtsinger.

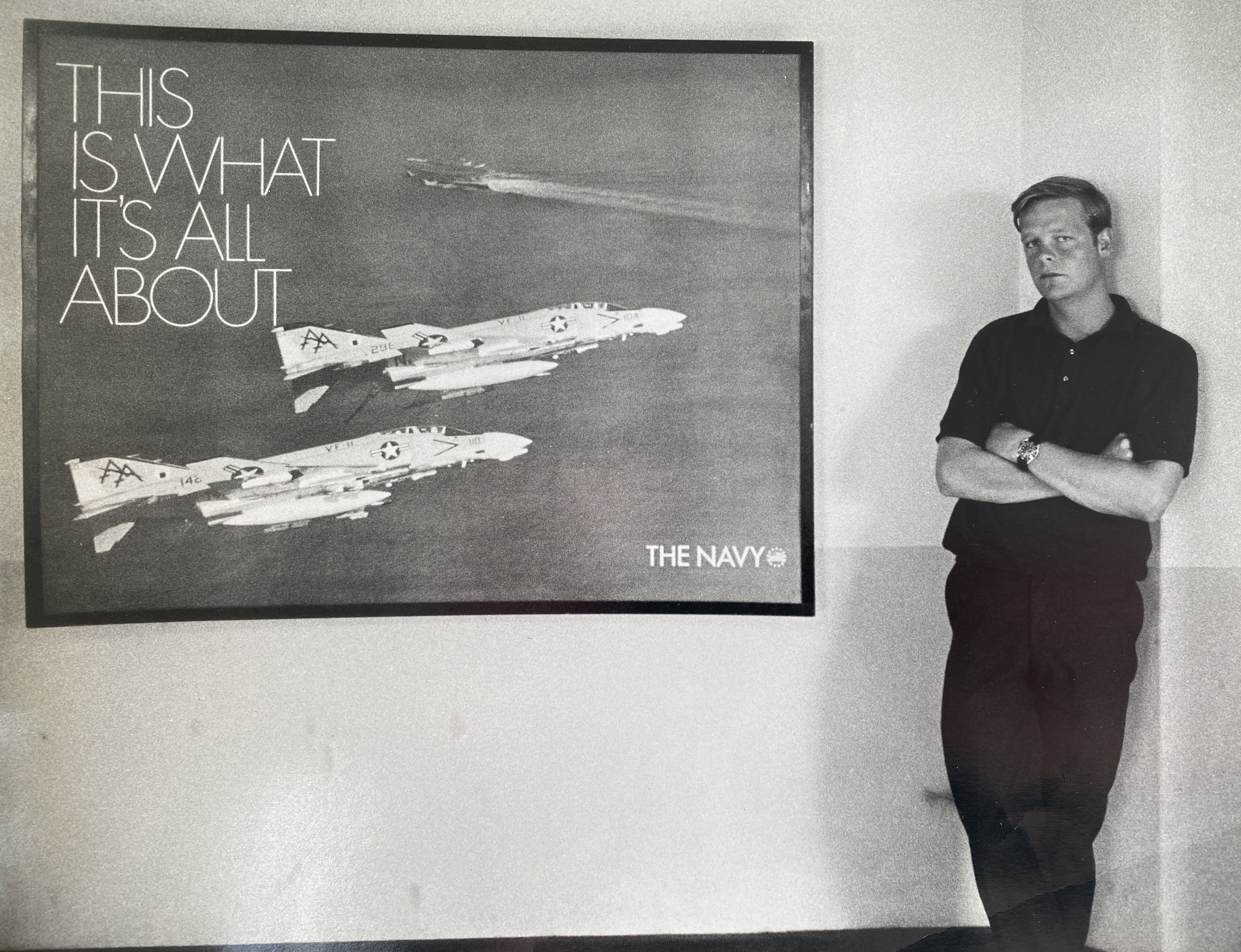
Curtsinger in the 1960s next to a U.S. Navy recruiting poster. He is credited for the photograph used in this poster.

=== Firsts ===
- First colored photographs published in the Naval Aviation News (1968)
- First published underwater photographs of right whales (1972) Argentina
- First published underwater photographs of narwhal whales
- First underwater photograph of leopard seals (1971)
- First photojournalist to cover the Mary Rose shipwreck.
- First photographs of emperor penguins (flying) swimming underwater
- First photograph (1984) of a Blainville's beaked whale mother and calf.

== Inspiring others ==
As new generations of photographers enter the field of photography, some have been inspired by Curtsinger's work, such as Brian Skerry. In a 2021 article in The Maine Magazine, Skerry recalls Curtsinger turning down a National Geographic photo shoot of the 1717 pirate shipwreck Whydah Gally, buried in the sand off Cape Cod. Curtsinger turned down the job due to scheduling issues, but put in a good word for Skerry, who in turn, took the job. Skerry had his photos published in the May 1999 issue of National Geographic.

== Personal life ==
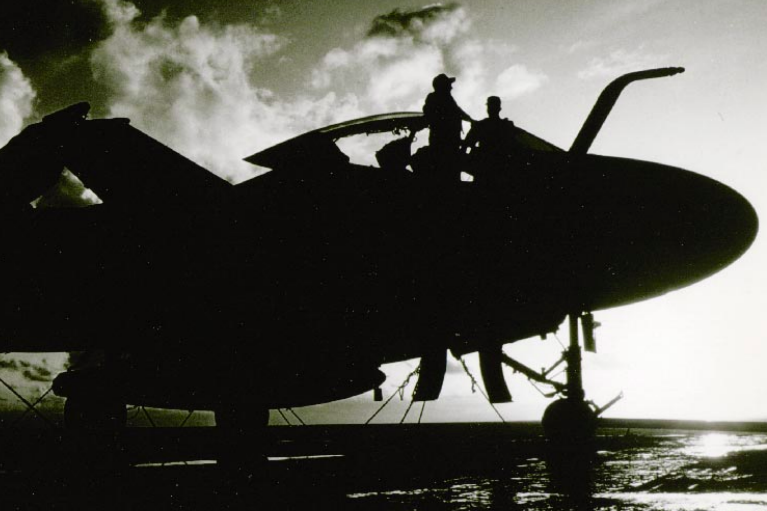
Silhouette of a Grumman A-6 Intruder on the deck of an aircraft carrier. Photo captured by Bill Curtsinger.

In 1972, during Curtsinger's second photo assignment with National Geographic about salt marshes, he moved to Maine, where in 1974 he married Kate Mahoney. They had two children together, Justin and Owen. In June 2003, Mahoney died from a seven-year battle with breast cancer. Curtsinger and Mahoney were married for twenty-nine years and during that time, Mahoney was responsible for the organization and sales of Curtsinger's stock photos business, which she created. Mahoney was a founding member of Peregrine Press located in Portland, Maine.

With the advance of the internet and declining stock photo sales, Curtsinger left Maine and moved to Port Townsend, Washington in 2006. He became the co-owner, along with his second wife Sue Ohlson, of Sunrise Coffee Company.

Even though Curtsinger in no longer a freelancer in the field of photography, he continues to photograph and in 2021 collaborated with Kenneth Brower on the book Curtsinger: Reflections on the Life and Adventures of Bill Curtsinger.

== Awards and recognition ==

1st row	Navy Good Conduct Medal	National Defense Service Medal	National Defense Service Medal

- (2001) National Geographic 100 Best wildlife photos
- (2002) "Outstanding Science Trade Book" National Science Teachers Association recognition for the book Sea Soup: Zooplankton
- (2006) NOGI Award Arts, Academy of Underwater Arts and Sciences
- (2022) Associate member of the Boston Sea Rovers
- (2022) Honorary member of Peregrine Press

== Exhibitions ==
- (1990) "Underwater Nudes" – Evans Gallery, Portland, Maine
- (2000) "Photographing Maine: 1840 to 2000" – Maine Coast Artists, Rockport, Maine.
- (2005) "Extreme Nature: Images from the World's Edge" University of New England, Westbrook, ME.
- (2006) "Oceans Expo II: A world to discover" – Instituto Cultural Peruano Norteamericano (ICPNA), Peru.
- (2007) "Underwater" Naturmuseum Senckenberg, Frankfurt, Germany

== Bibliography ==
=== Cover stories ===
Magazine covers that have featured Curtsinger's photos.

Cover stories
Title	Year	Publication	Author	Location	Ref
Our Crowded Skies	1970	Proceedings	Cdr. R. J. Koch, Jr., USN	Sky	
R/V Hero: Assignment Antarctic	1971	Proceedings	Curtsinger, Bill	Antarctica	
Antarctica's Nearer Side	1971	National Geographic	Mathews, Samuel W.	Antarctica	
Life or Death for the Harp Seal	1976	National Geographic	Lavigne, David M.	Canada	
Will We Kill the Last Whale?	1979	Life	Fadiman, Anne	Global	
16th Century Basque Whaling in America	1985	National Geographic	Robert, Grenier; Tuck, James	Canada	
Oldest Known Shipwreck	1987	National Geographic	Bass, George	Aegean Sea	
The bottom of the bottom of the world	1992	Natural History	Campbell, David G.	Global	
Sea Turtles: In a Race for Survival	1994	National Geographic	Rudloe, Anne; Rudloe, Jack	Bahamas	
Gray Reef Sharks	1995	National Geographic	Curtsinger, Bill	Marshall Islands	
Generation to Generation	1995	Orion	Sobel, David Et al.	Costa Rica	

=== Books ===
Books
Title	Year	Authors	Publisher	ISBN
Wake of the Whale	1979	Brower, Kenneth	Friends of the Earth	ISBN 978-0-52522-950-6
The Pine Barrens	1981	McPhee, John	Farrar, Straus and Giroux	ISBN 0-374-23362-4
Monk Seal Hideaway	1995	Ackerman, Diane	Crown Publishing Group	ISBN 978-0-51759-674-6
Sea Soup: Phytoplankton	1999	Cerullo, Maru M.	Tilbury House, Publishers	ISBN 978-0-88448-208-6
Sea Soup: Zooplankton	2001	Cerullo, Mary M.	Tilbury House, Publishers	ISBN 978-0-88448-219-2
Life Under Ice	2003	Cerullo, Mary M.	Tilbury House, Publishers	ISBN 978-0-88448-246-8
Extreme Nature: Images from the World's Edge	2005	Curtsinger, Bill	White Star Publishers	ISBN 978-8-85440-078-8
Curtsinger: Reflections on the Life and Adventures of Bill Curtsinger	2021	Brower, Kenneth	Northwind Art	ISBN 978-0-98835-508-8

=== Film and video ===
Film
Title	Year	Role	Distributor	Ref
Grey Reef Sharks	1995	Self	National Geographic Explorer	
The Life of a Tiger Shark	2000	Self	National Geographic Explorer	
The Naked Brothers Band: The Movie	2005	Archival footage	Paramount	
An Inconvenient Truth	2006	Archival footage	Paramount	
Cannibal Sharks	2019	Archival footage	National Geographic channel	

=== Journals ===
Journals
Title	Year	Authors	Journal	Publisher	Role	Ref
Population Study of Seals in the Weddell Sea	1969	Erickson, Albert W.; Cline, David R.; Hopman, Robert J.	Antarctic Journal of the United States	National Science Foundation	Photographer; Cover photo	
Freezing Resistance in Fishes of the Antarctic Peninsula	1969	Devries, A.L.; Department of Food Science & Technology; University of California, Davis	Antarctic Journal of the United States	National Science Foundation	Photographer	
The Prey Capture by the Brown Pelican	1975	Schreiber, Ralf W.; Woolfenden, Glen E.; Curtsinger, William R.	The Auk	American Ornithological Society	Co-author	
Research ship Hero is 7 years old	1975	Michael Mulcary	Antarctic Journal of the United States	National Science Foundation	Photographer	
Preliminary Underwater Observations of the Breeding Behavior of the Harp Seal (Pagophilus groenlandicus)	1978	Merdsoy, Bora R.; Curtsinger, Bill; Renouf, Deane	Journal of Mammalogy	Oxford University	Co-author	
Observations on Structure and Evaluation of Possible Functions of the Vexillum in Larval Carapidae (Ophidiiformes)	1984	Govoni, John J.; Olney, John E.; Markle, Douglas F.; Curtsinger, William	Bulletin of Marine Science	Rosenstiel School of Marine, Atmospheric, and Earth Science	Co-author	
The Archeology of the Atomic Bomb: A Submerged Cultural Resources Assessment of the Sunken Fleet of Operation Crossroads at Bikini and Kwajalein Atoll Lagoons	1991	Delgado, J.P.; Lenihan, D.; Murphy, L.	Southwest Cultural Resources Center Professional Papers	United States Department of the Interior	Photographer	
