= Heroine (disambiguation) =

A heroine is a female hero.

Heroine or Heroines may also refer to:

== Music ==
=== Albums ===
- Heroine (Thornhill album), 2022
- Heroine (From First to Last album) or the title song, 2006
- Heroine (Minori Chihara album), 2004
- Heroine, an album by the Wild Strawberries, 1995

=== Songs ===
- "Heroine" (Shakespears Sister song), 1988
- "Heroine" (Sunmi song), 2018
- "Heroine", a song by Maroon 5, 2026
- "Heroine", a song by Blonde Redhead from 23, 2007
- "Heroine", a song by Ive from I've IVE, 2023
- "Heroine", a song by Nami Tamaki from Make Progress, 2005
- "Heroine", a song by Sleeping with Sirens from Madness, 2015
- "Heroine", a song by Suede from Dog Man Star, 1994
- "Heroine", a song by Matt Mays from When the Angels Make Contact, 2006

== Films ==
- The Heroine (film), a 1967 uncompleted lost film by Orson Welles
- Heroine (1972 film), an Argentine film
- Héroïnes, a 1997 French film
- Heroine (2005 film), a Spanish film
- Heroine (2012 film), a Bollywood film
- Heroin(e), a 2017 documentary film

== Other uses ==
- HMS Heroine, four ships of the British Royal Navy
- Heroine-class submarine, a class of submarine of the South African Navy
- Heroines: Powerful Indian Women of Myth and History, a 2017 book by Ira Mukhoty
- Gertrude Yorkes or Heroine, a Marvel Comics superhero character
- The Heroine (novel), an 1813 novel by Eaton Stannard Barrett

== See also ==
- "Hero/Heroine", a 2006 song by Boys Like Girls
- Heroine Virtual, an open source software company
- Heroin (disambiguation)
- Heroina (fish), a genus of fish belonging to the family Cichlidae
