= 英雄 =

英雄, meaning hero, may refer to:

- Hero (2002 film), 2002 wuxia film
- Hero (2022 South Korean film) (영웅; Hanja: 英雄), 2022 South Korean film
- "Hero" (英雄), song by Jay Chou from his 2016 album Jay Chou's Bedtime Stories
- Hideo, Japanese masculine given name
- Nguyễn Anh Hùng (阮英雄; born 1992), Vietnamese footballer
- Trần Anh Hùng (陳英雄; born 1962), Vietnamese-born French film director and screenwriter

== See also ==
- Hero (disambiguation)
