= Tragic hero (disambiguation) =

A tragic hero is the protagonist of a tragedy.

Tragic hero may also refer to:

- Tragic Hero (film), directed in 1987 by Taylor Wong
- "Tragic Hero" (music), a single by Funker Vogt
- Tragic Hero Records, a record label

== See also ==
- Antihero, a related narrative concept
- Antivillain, a related narrative concept
- Hero (disambiguation)
- Tragedy (disambiguation)
- Fallen Heroes (disambiguation)
