= Fallen Heroes =

Fallen Heroes or Fallen Hero may refer to:

== Arts and entertainment ==
=== Film ===
- Fallen Heroes (film), a 2007 Italian crime-drama film

=== Literature ===
- Fallen Heroes (novel), a 1994 Star Trek: Deep Space Nine novel by Dafydd ab Hugh

=== Music ===
- Fallen Heroes (EP), a 2016 EP by Metal Allegiance

=== Television ===
==== Shows ====
- Fallen Hero (TV series), a 1978 British television series

==== Episodes ====
- "Fallen Hero", a 2004 episode of Casualty series 18
- "Fallen Hero", a 2007 episode of Chaotic
- "Fallen Hero", a 2000 episode of Drop the Beat
- "Fallen Hero", a 1995 episode of Flipper (1995)
- "Fallen Hero", a 2013 episode of Hawaii Five-0 (2010) season 4
- "Fallen Hero", a 2002 episode of Star Trek: Enterprise
- "Fallen Hero", a 2004 episode of Static Shock
- "Fallen Hero", a 2018 episode of The First 48
- "Fallen Hero", a 2016 episode of Trickster (Japanese)
- "Fallen Heroes", a 2000 episode of Heartbeat (British)
- "Fallen Heroes" (Homicide: Life on the Street), a 1998 episode of Homicide: Life on the Street
- "Fallen Heroes", a 2010 episode of Shameless (British)
- "Fallen Heroes", a 2016 episode of The Carmichael Show
- "Fallen Heroes", a 2017 episode of Wakfu
- "Kid Cosmic and the Fallen Hero", a 2021 episode of Kid Cosmic

== Other uses ==
- Fallen Heroes Act, an act of the U.S. Congress

== See also ==
- Tragic hero, a related narrative concept of a hero that, because of determined circumstances, is prone to fall to evil.
- Antihero, a related narrative concept of a hero
- anti-villain, a related narrative concept
- Fallen (disambiguation)
- Hero (disambiguation)
- Tragic hero (disambiguation)
