= Robert Dale =

Robert Dale may refer to:

- Robert Dale (explorer) (1812–1853), first European explorer to cross the Darling Range in Western Australia
- Robert William Dale (1829–1895), English Congregationalist church leader
- Bob Dale (politician) (Robert Alexander Dale, 1875–1953), South Australian unionist and politician
- Robert L. Dale (1924–2020), American pilot with the U.S. Navy and the National Science Foundation
- Bob Dale (footballer) (Robert Jenkins Dale, 1931–2007), English footballer

== See also ==
- Robbie Dale (1940–2021), British DJ
- Robert Dale Owen (1801–1877), politician
