= Heros =

Heros may refer to:

- plural of Hero (sandwich)
- Heros (fish), a genus of South American cichlids
- Heros, a 4th-century BC play by Menander
- Héros, 2013 album by French recording artist Eddy Mitchell
- H.E.R.O.S., 2017 album by French recording artist Shy'm
- Heros of Arles, early fifth century bishop
- Heros the Spartan, an Eagle comic strip
- Heros Racing, a Japanese motor racing team
- French ship Héros, the name of several ships

== See also ==
- Hero (disambiguation)
  - Hero, from the Greek ἥρως (hērōs)
- Heroes (disambiguation)
- Hero's, a Japanese mixed martial arts promotion
- Thracian Heros, a recurring motif of a horseman
