= The Hero =

The Hero may refer to:

== Film ==
- The Hero (1917 film), an American silent comedy starring Oliver Hardy
- The Hero (1923 film), an American World War I drama directed by Louis J. Gasnier
- The Hero, English language title of Nayak, a 1966 Indian Bengali-language drama by Satyajit Ray
- The Hero, the American alternative title of Bloomfield, a 1971 British-Israeli drama
- The Hero: Love Story of a Spy, a 2003 Bollywood action-adventure
- The Hero (2004 film), an Angolan war drama
- The Hero (2017 film), an American drama starring Sam Elliott
- Devil: The Hero, a 2024 Indian Kannada-language action

== Television ==
=== Episodes ===
- "The Hero", 12 O'Clock High season 1, episode 32 (1965)
- "The Hero", A New Kind of Family episode 3 (1979)
- "The Hero", Alfred Hitchcock Presents season 5, episode 29 (1960)
- "The Hero", Are You Being Served? series 7, episode 5 (1979)
- "The Hero", Barney Miller season 1, episode 13 (1975)
- "The Hero", Baywatch season 10, episode 15 (2000)
- "The Hero", Bobby's World season 4, episode 1 (1993)
- "The Hero", Cannon season 5, episode 12 (1975)
- "The Hero", Covington Cross episode 5 (1992)
- "The Hero", Curb Your Enthusiasm season 8, episode 6 (2011)
- "The Hero", Dick Turpin season 1, episode 10 (1979)
- "The Hero", Dixon of Dock Green series 2, episode 6 (1956)
- "The Hero", Douglas Fairbanks Presents season 3, episode 30 (1955)
- "The Hero", Dr. Simon Locke season 1, episode 11 (1971)
- "The Hero", Henry's Cat series 2, episode 7 (1987)
- "The Hero", Highway to Heaven season 3, episodes 20 (1987)
- "The Hero", Kids Incorporated season 6, episode 3 (1989)
- "The Hero", King of Kensington season 3, episode 11 (1977)
- "The Hero", Man Without a Gun season 2, episode 3 (1959)
- "The Hero", Nathan for You season 3, episode 8 (2015)
- "The Hero", Night Heat season 2, episode 1 (1986)
- "The Hero", One Day at a Time season 8, episode 16 (1983)
- "The Hero", Slattery's People season 2, episode 7 (1965)
- "The Hero", Studio One season 4, episode 8 (1951)
- "The Hero", Studio One season 6, episode 45 (1954)
- "The Hero", Sword of Freedom season 1, episode 12 (1958)
- "The Hero", That's My Mama season 1, episode 22 (1975)
- "The Hero", The Adventures of Gulliver episode 17 (1969)
- "The Hero", The Adventures of Robin Hood series 2, episode 8 (1956)
- "The Hero", The Amazing World of Gumball season 2, episode 22 (2013)
- "The Hero", The Beverly Hillbillies season 8, episode 13 (1969)
- "The Hero", The Brady Bunch season 1, episode 21 (1970)
- "The Hero", The Donna Reed Show season 1, episode 30 (1959)
- "The Hero", The F.B.I. season 4, episode 13 (1968)
- "The Hero", The Flintstones season 3, episode 18 (1963)
- "The Hero", The Flying Doctors series 5, episode 2 (1990)
- "The Hero", The Guns of Will Sonnett season 1, episode 17 (1967)
- "The Hero", The Legend of Prince Valiant season 2, episode 24 (1993)
- "The Hero", The Littlest Hobo season 3, episode 7 (1981)
- "The Hero", The Silent Force episode 2 (1970)
- "The Hero", The Street series 3, episode 4 (2009)
- "The Hero", The Virginian season 3, episode 4 (1964)
- "The Hero", The Waltons season 5, episode 19 (1977)
- "The Hero", Touched by an Angel season 1, episode 11 (1995)
- "The Hero", V: The Series episode 11 (1985)
- "The Hero", Wander Over Yonder season 1, episode 9a (2014)

=== Shows ===
- The Hero (1966 TV series), a 1966 American television series
- The Hero (2013 TV series), a 2013 American reality television series

== Literature ==
- "The Hero", an 1850 poem by Lydia Sigourney
- "The Hero", an 1895 poem by John Greenleaf Whittier
- The Hero, a 1901 novel by W. Somerset Maugham
- "The Hero", a 1906 poem by Henry David Thoreau
- "The Hero", a 1911 short story by Margarita Spalding Gerry
- "The Hero", a 1917 poem by Siegfried Sassoon
- "The Hero" (poem), a 1913 poem written by Rabindranath Tagore
- The Hero: A Study in Tradition, Myth and Drama, a 1936 book by FitzRoy Somerset, 4th Baron Raglan
- The Hero, a 1949 novel by Millard Lampell
- "The Hero", a 1971 short story by George R. R. Martin and collected in Dreamsongs: A Retrospective.
- The Hero, a 1973 novel by Peter Haining
- The Hero (novel), a 2004 science fiction novel by John Ringo and Michael Z. Williamson

== Music ==
- The Hero (opera), a 1976 opera by Gian Carlo Menotti
- The Hero, a 2025 EP by Dan Bremnes
- "The Hero", a track on the Amon Amarth album Twilight of the Thunder God
- "The Hero", a song on the 1980 Queen album Flash Gordon

== See also ==
- Hero (disambiguation)
- The Heroes (disambiguation)
- Nayak (disambiguation) (lit. 'Hero' in Indic languages)
