= Héroe =

Héroe may refer to one of the following songs:

- "Héroe", the Spanish version of Mariah Carey's song "Hero"
- "Héroe", the Spanish version of Enrique Iglesias's song "Hero"

== See also ==
- Héroes (disambiguation)
