= Robert L. Dale =

American pilot (1924–2020)

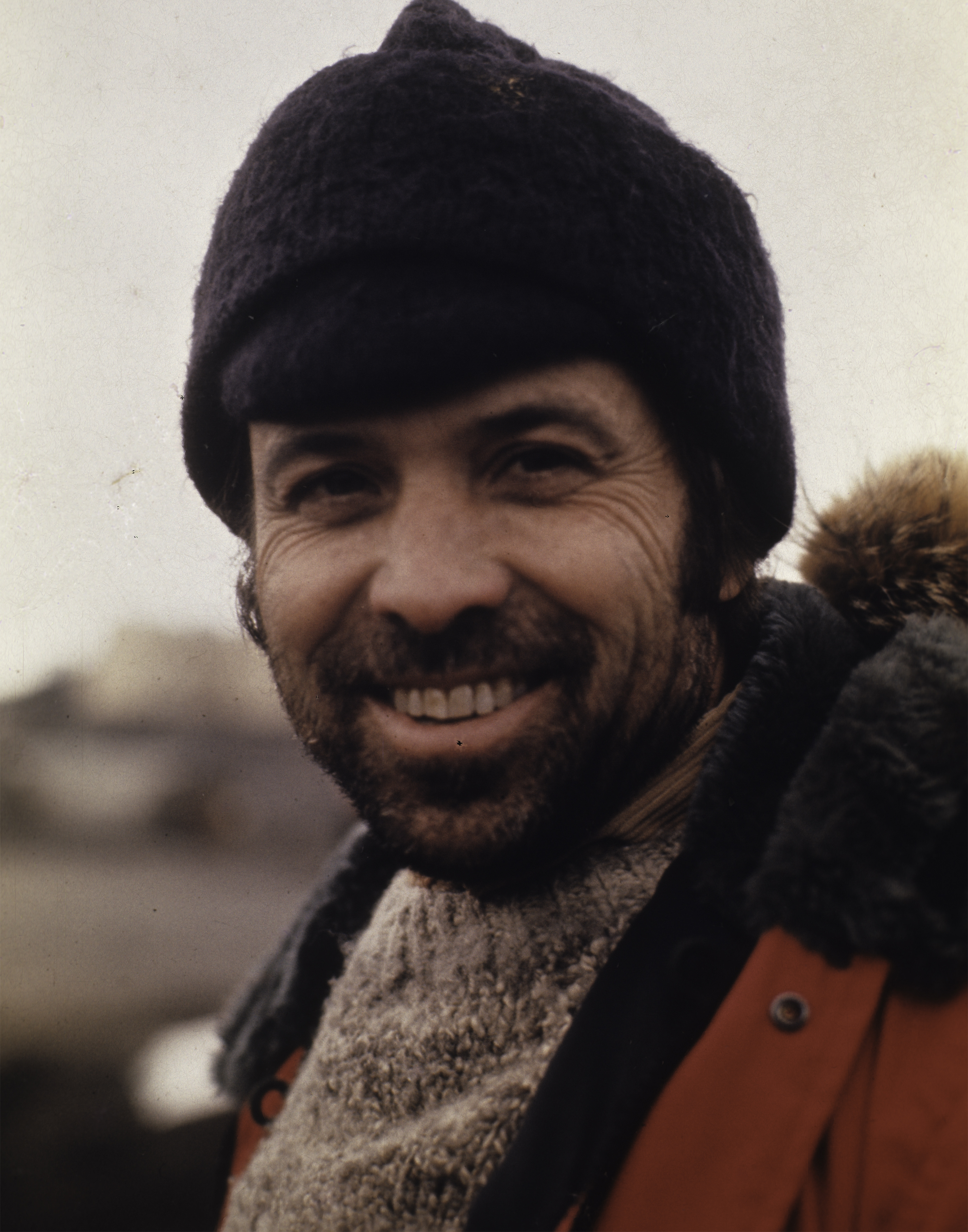
- Dale at McMurdo Station, 1972
- Born: 14 October 1924; Colton, California
- Died: 22 June 2020 (aged 95); Brunswick, Maine
- Other name: Bob Dale
- Education: George Washington University (BS)
- Occupation: Aircraft pilot
- Years active: 1945–1975
- Employers: NSF, 1967–1975; U.S. Navy, 1945–1966
- Political party: Green Party
- Military career
- Branch: United States Navy
- Service years: 1945–1966
- Rank: Commander
- Units: VC-6; VX-6
- Assignments: Operation Deep Freeze V
- Awards: World War II Victory Medal; Commendation Medal; Dale Glacier namesake

Robert Dale (14 October 1924 – 22 June 2020), known as Bob Dale, was an American aircraft pilot for the United States Navy from 1942 to 1966; and a pilot for the National Science Foundation from 1967 to 1975. For his efforts as a pilot in Antarctica as Lieutenant Commander, USN, and part of the Antarctic Operation Deep Freeze (1959–1960), Dale Glacier was named after him by the Advisory Committee on Antarctic Names (US-ACAN) in 1963.

== Early life ==
Dale was born 14 October 1924, in Colton, California to Lula Irena Walters and Charles Dale. He is the oldest of four children.

== U.S. Navy career ==
=== WWII ===
At the age of 18 in 1942 Dale entered Flight Preparatory School, at the University of Texas at Austin. From there entering Primary Flight Training at Naval Air Station Bunker Hill, Indiana. He earned his gold wings as a United States Naval Aviator in 1945 and was stationed at Naval Air Station Pensacola, flying the Chance-Vought F4U Corsair.

=== Post WWII ===
As Lieutenant (j.g.) USNR, from 1946 to 1949 Dale was assigned as a flight Instructor to Cory Field in Pensacola, Florida where he trained pilots formation flying and aerobatics such as loops, rolls, spins, precision maneuvers, takeoffs, landings, and instrument control reading.

=== Korean War ===
During the Korean War, as a lieutenant (USNR), Dale learned to speak Russian, and was certified as an interpreter. Later in his career, Dale would teach the Russian language to scientists while stationed in Antarctica.

In 1953, Dale was stationed at Naval Air Station North Island San Diego as part of the Heavy Attack Squadron VC-6, where he flew the Savage AJ-1, a three engine plane and the first capable aircraft to deliver the Atom Bomb via aircraft carrier. In mid-1953 Dale was transferred to the Naval Air Facility in Atsugi, Japan, where he flew nuclear strike missions, practicing bombing runs, Japan acting as a stand-in target. Nuclear weapons were not on board during these training missions, however the Savage was equipped with a dummy bomb to simulate the weight.

In 1955 Dale received a commission with the U.S. Navy as Lieutenant Commander.

While in the U.S. Navy (1959), Dale received his bachelor's degree from George Washington University graduating cum laude, majoring in geology. Géza Teleki, a Geology professor at the university and Dale's mentor, encouraged him to take part in the U.S. Antarctic Research Program (USARP).

=== Deep Freeze V and Dale Glacier (1959–1960) ===
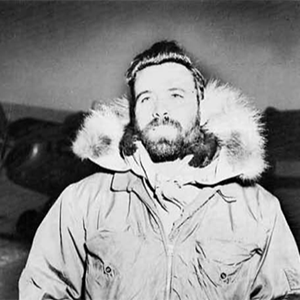
LCDR Robert L. Dale, USN at Palmer Station 1959

As Lieutenant Commander, USN, and part of Antarctic Operation Deep Freeze (1959–1960), Dale was Officer In-Charge of the wintering-over Air Development Squadron Six (VX-6) Detachment Alpha at McMurdo Station. He was part of a team that flew scientist to remote, unexplored, mountain ranges and ice sheets to collect samples, run experiments and compile scientific data.

On 10 February 1960, Dale and his crew, evacuated the USARP Victoria Land Traverse (VLT), on Rennick Glacier, and conducted an aerial photographic reconnaissance to Rennick Bay on the coast before returning the VLT team to McMurdo Station.

For Dale's efforts, the Dale Glacier (78°17′S 162°2′E) was named after him by the Advisory Committee on Antarctic Names (US-ACAN) in 1963.

During Deep Freeze 5, Dale and his VX-6 Squadron carried out the first flight of land-based aircraft from Christchurch New Zealand to Antarctica and carried out the longest logistics flight in Antarctic history, at that point in time. Dale and his squadron photo mapped hundreds of thousands of square miles of Antarctica; and developed new, improved techniques in polar navigation.

== National Science Foundation ==
After retiring from the Navy in 1966 (CDR, USN), Dale continued his Antarctic explorations as a representative of the National Science Foundation (NSF) from 1967 until 1975.

=== IWSOE ===
In 1967–68 while working for the Office of Polar Programs (OPP) as a USARP Representative for NSF, Dale oversaw the International Weddell Sea Oceanographic Expeditions-68; setting up a plan to outfit the U.S. Coast Guard's USS Glacier, icebreaker with trawling winches, other oceanographic equipment and scientific laboratories. This would-be the first comprehensive oceanographic survey of the Weddell Sea, supporting Norwegian scientists placing an array of underwater current meters on the continental slope to measure the flow of Antarctic bottom water.

=== R/V Hero ===
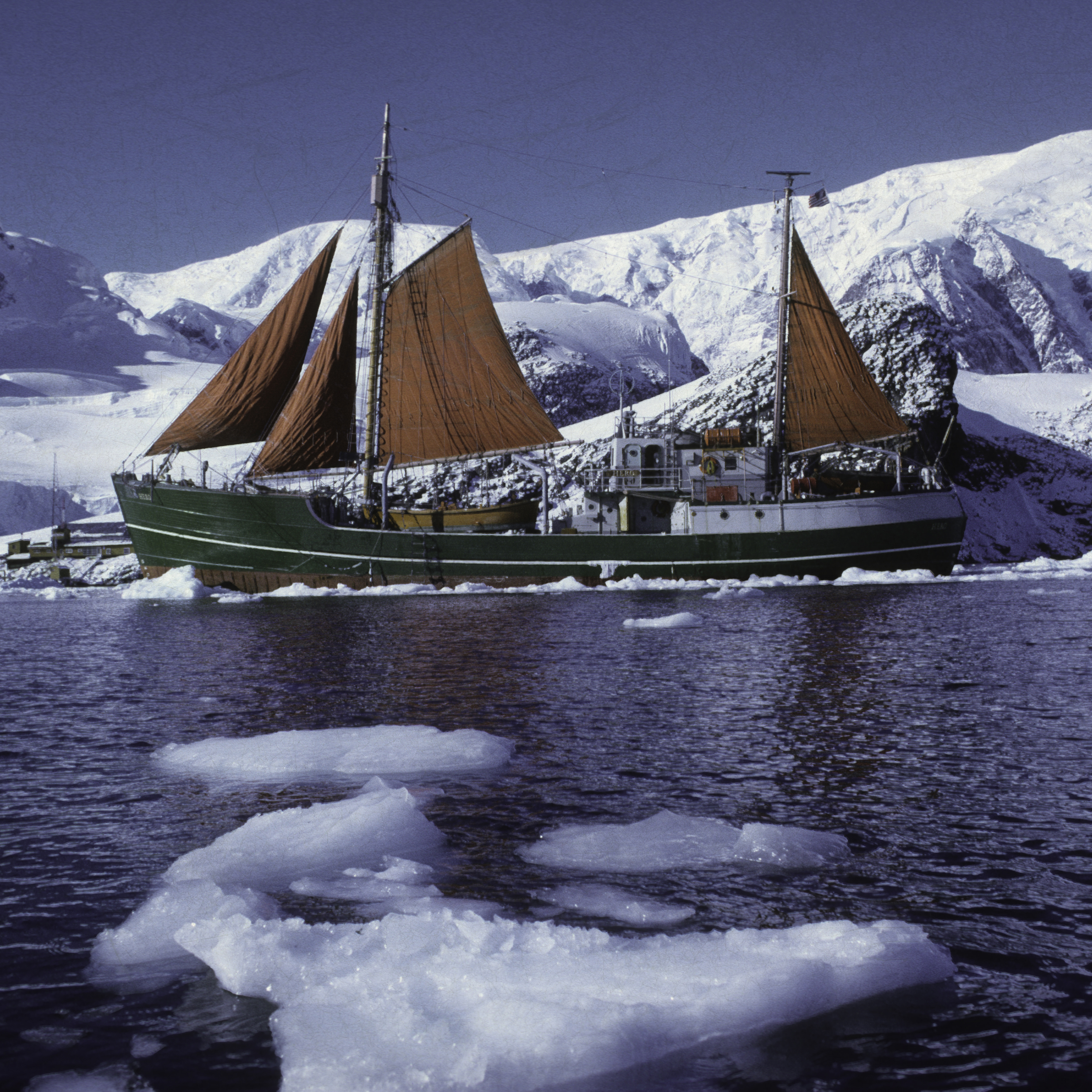
RV Hero at Paradise Bay, Antarctica. 1969

During Deep Freeze 1968–1969, Dale succeeded the retired John "Jack" Crowell, who oversaw the construction and launch of the floating scientific laboratory Research Vessel Hero; Dale underwent sea trials on the coast of Maine where the Hero was built, meeting them at Palmer Station in Antarctica. As the NSF Representative (Special Projects Officer), Dale spent a lot of his career in Antarctica on the Hero.

=== Deception Island ===
in 1969 while in Washington, D.C. and preparing for Deep Freeze '70–'71, Dale learned of the volcanic eruption at Deception Island, Antarctica. He helped in assembling a team of scientists who compiled research on dating the various eruptions over the years. Dale, as the NSF Representative in 1971 accompanied the scientists to and from Deception Island.

==== Jacques Cousteau ====
During Deep Freeze 1971–72 Deception Island was visited by Jacques Cousteau, the famous oceanographer and his ship, the Calypso. Dale as the NSF Representative agreed to supply the Calypso with needed fuel but the next day a crew member was killed by the tail rotor of a tiny Helicopter on the stern of the Calypso. Their cruise was abruptly terminated.

==== National Geographic ====
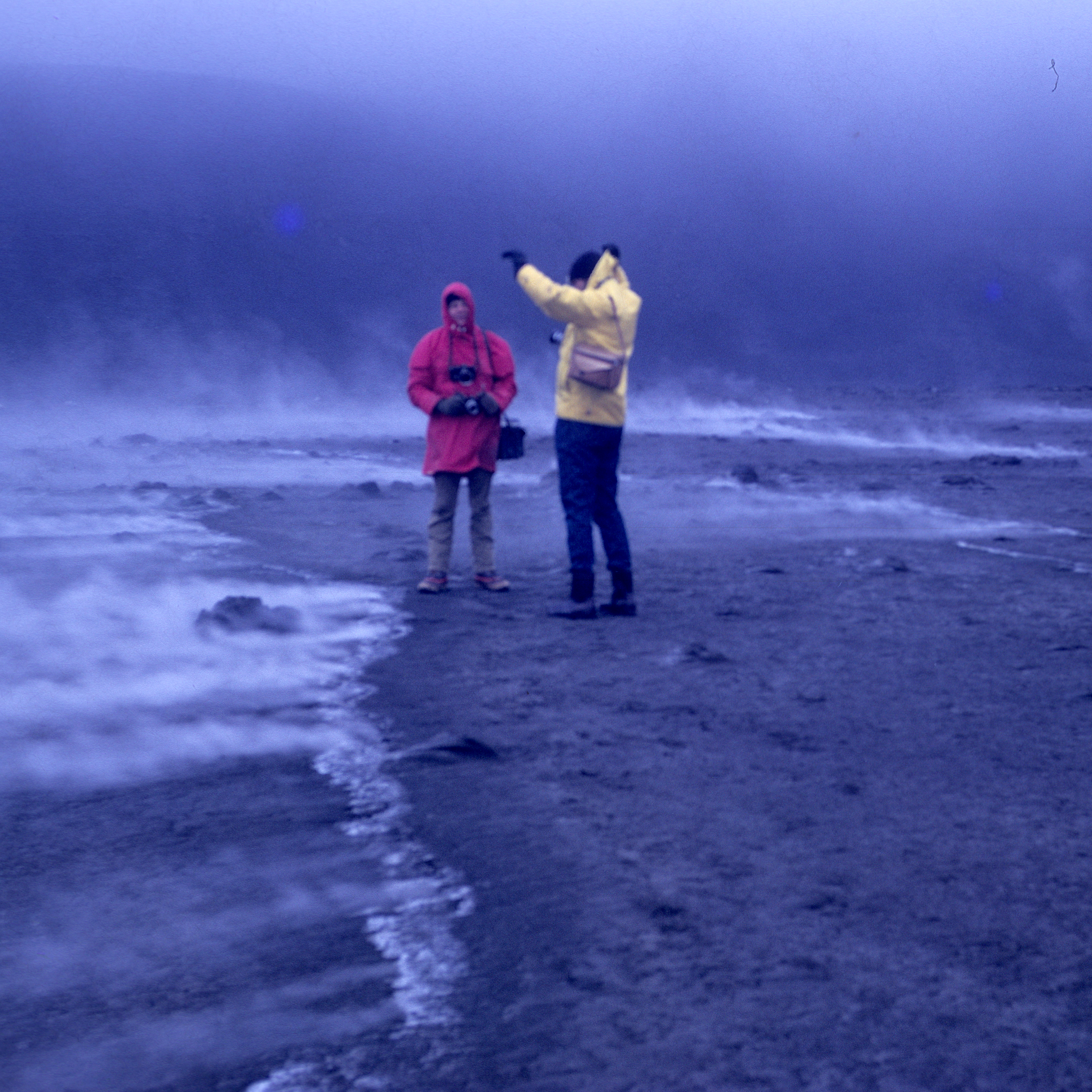
Bill Curtsinger and Sam Mathews from National Geographic examining a fumarole on Deception Island, 1971

During Deep Freeze 1971–1972, National Geographic Magazine was on board the Hero writing a story about Palmer Station, Deception Island, and the RV Hero. Dale was quoted while talking to a new batch of scientists that just came to Palmer Station.

Please don't go up to the glacier without a guide, you can fall into a crevasse before you know it's there. We are here to help you in your research in anyway we can-but we'd rather not have to do it with rescue ropes and a stretcher.

— Bob Dale, "Antarctica's Nearer Side", National Geographic

Even after hearing this statement from Dale, the author of the article, Samuel W. Matthews, fell into a crevasse and had to be rescued by glaciologists Olav Orheim and Terence Hughes.

== Antarctican Society ==
In 2008 Dale donated over 2,000 slides to The Antarctician Society, documenting his time in Antarctica. The slides were then digitized.

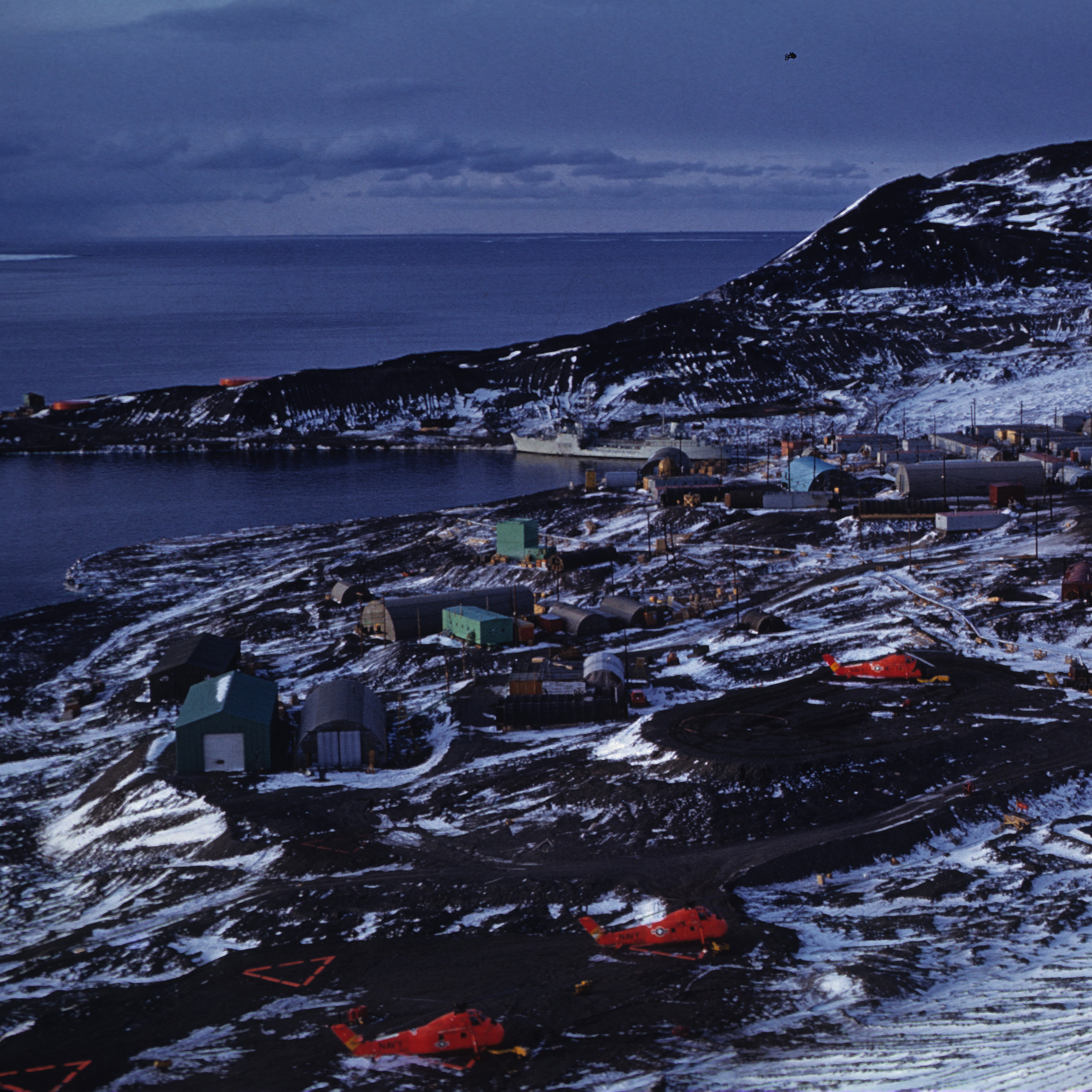
McMurdo Station, Antarctica 1964

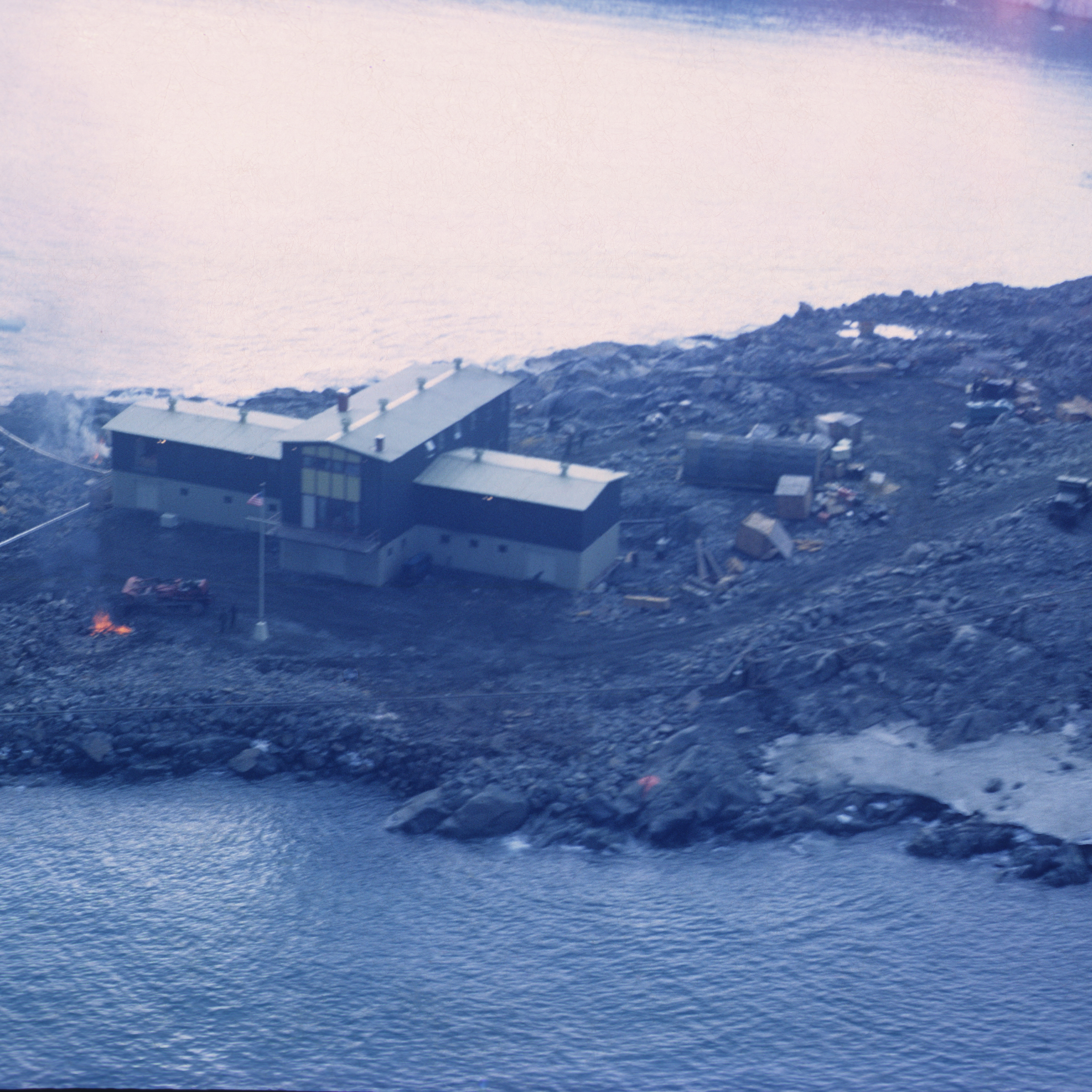
Palmer Station Antarctica, 1968 Anvers Island

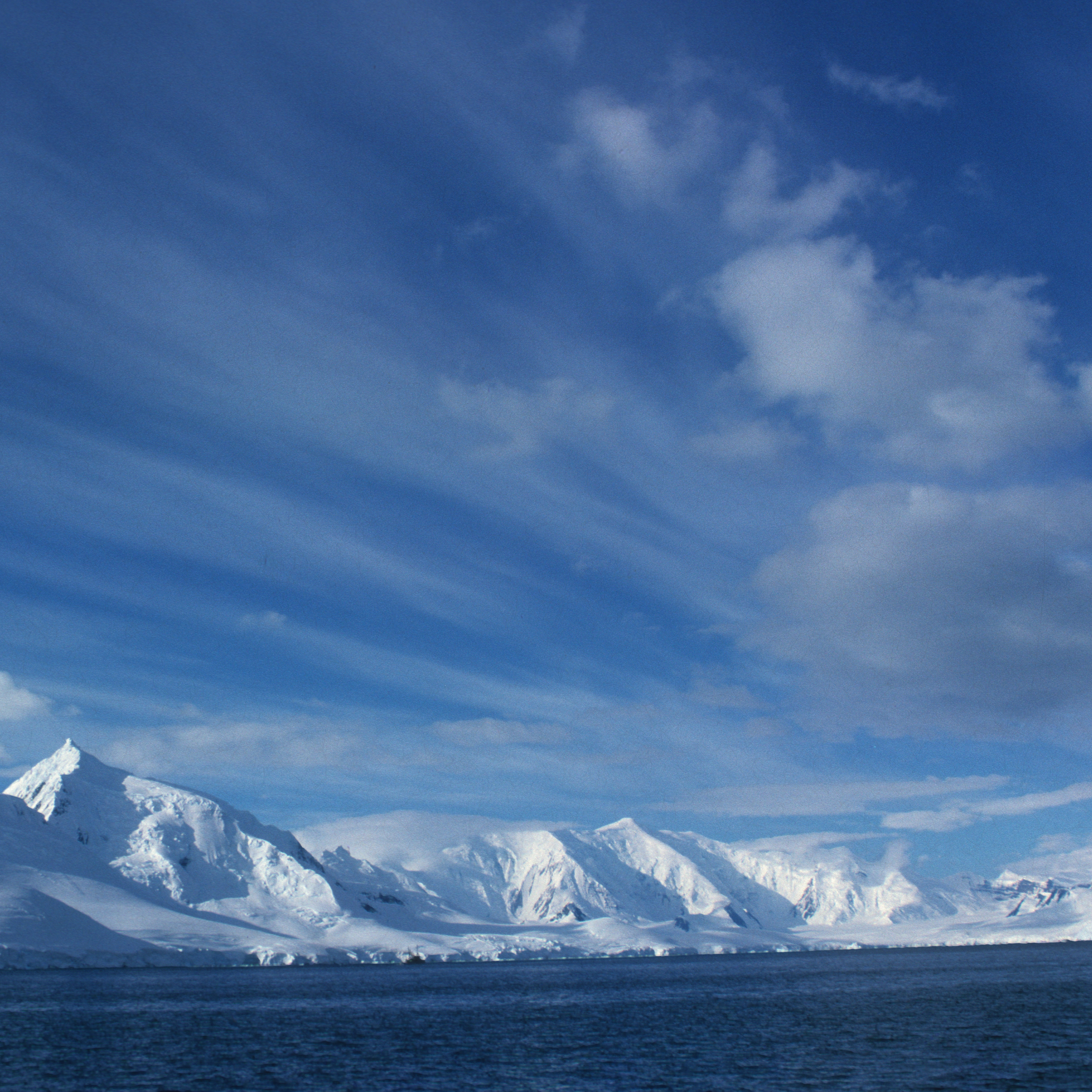
Ice and Mountains in Antarctica, 1969

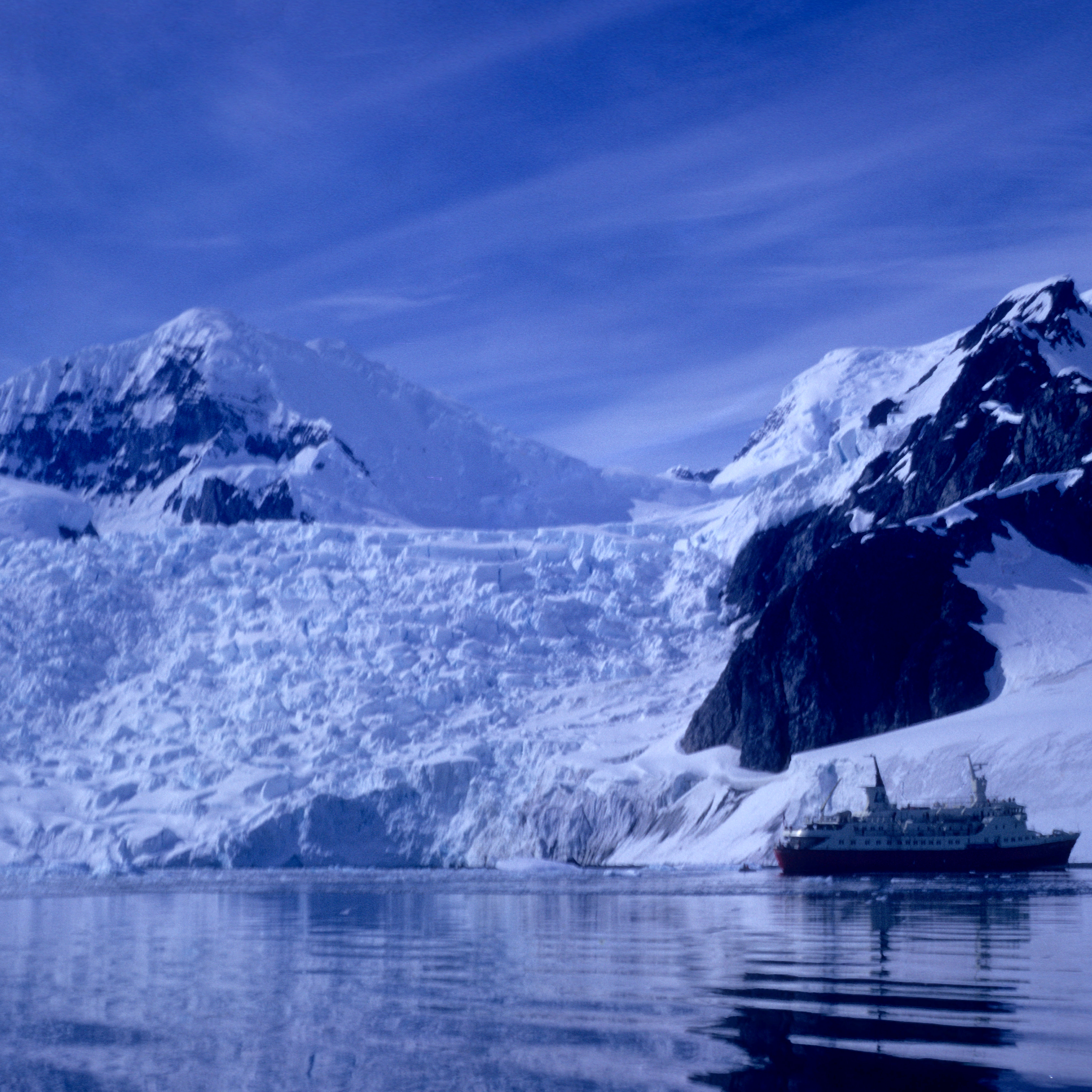
Lindbald Explorer, Paradise Bay Antarctica, 1970

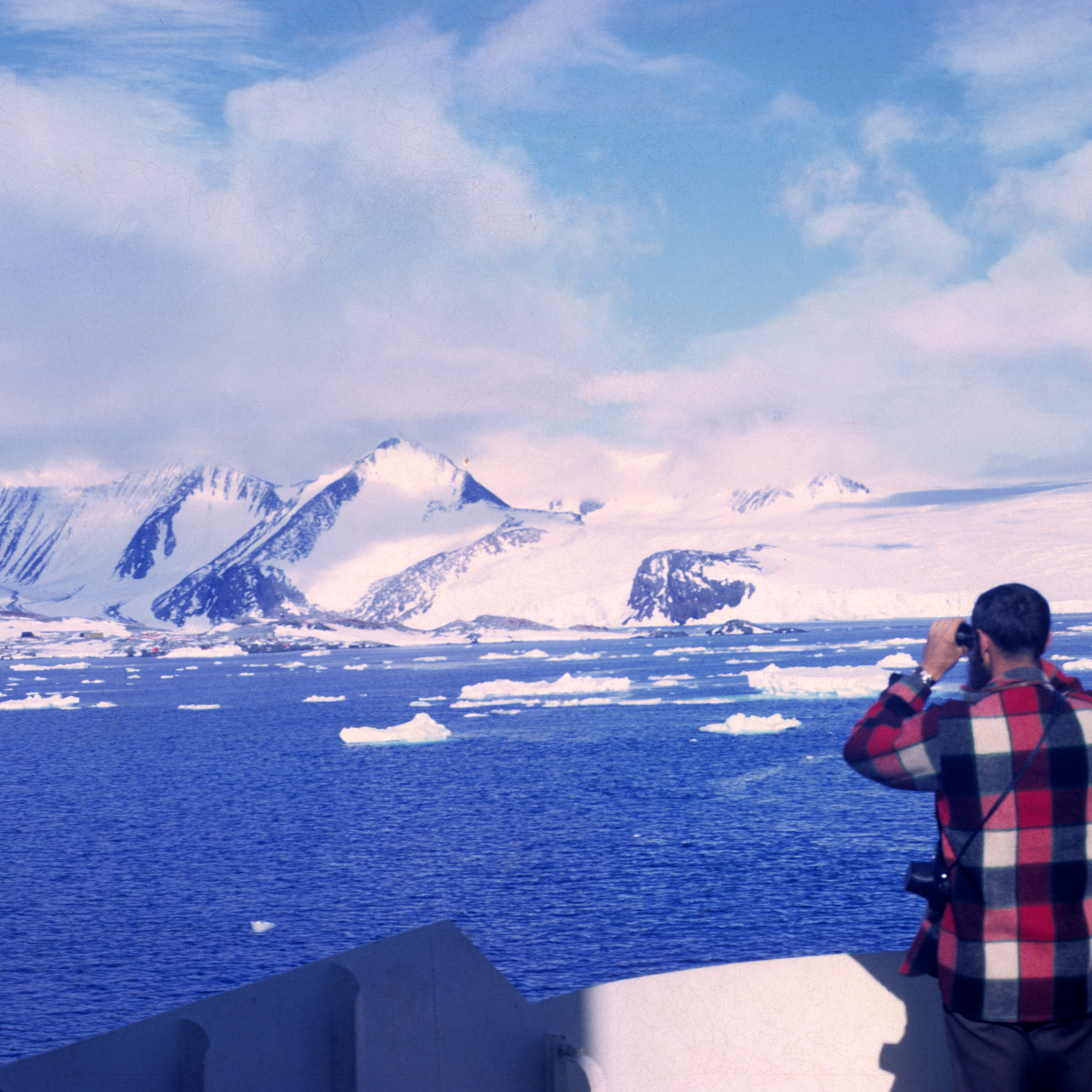
Esperanza Station, Antarctica 1968

== Personal life ==
On 28 September 1945, Dale married Norma M. Cundiff in Riverside, California. They had three children and were divorced in 1971. Their children include Jeffrey Norman Dale (30 January 1949), Robert Kimberly Dale (3 November 1951) and Marina Leigh Dale Passano (9 March 1956).

=== Friendship with Igor Alekseevich Zotikov ===
Igor Alekseevich Zotikov (Russian: Зотиков, Игорь Алексеевич) and Dale met at Deep Freeze V in 1965 and became lifelong friends. Zotikov was a Soviet glaciologist, who in 1960, with the materials from the results of the International Geophysical Year (IGY), wrote his thesis predicting freshwater lakes under the thickness of the Antarctic ice.

For his work in the Antarctic, Zotikov was awarded a glacier named after him, Zotikov Glacier.

Zotikov consulted with Dale for his book Winter Soldiers; he died in 2010 with the book being published shortly before his death.

== Later life, retirement and death ==
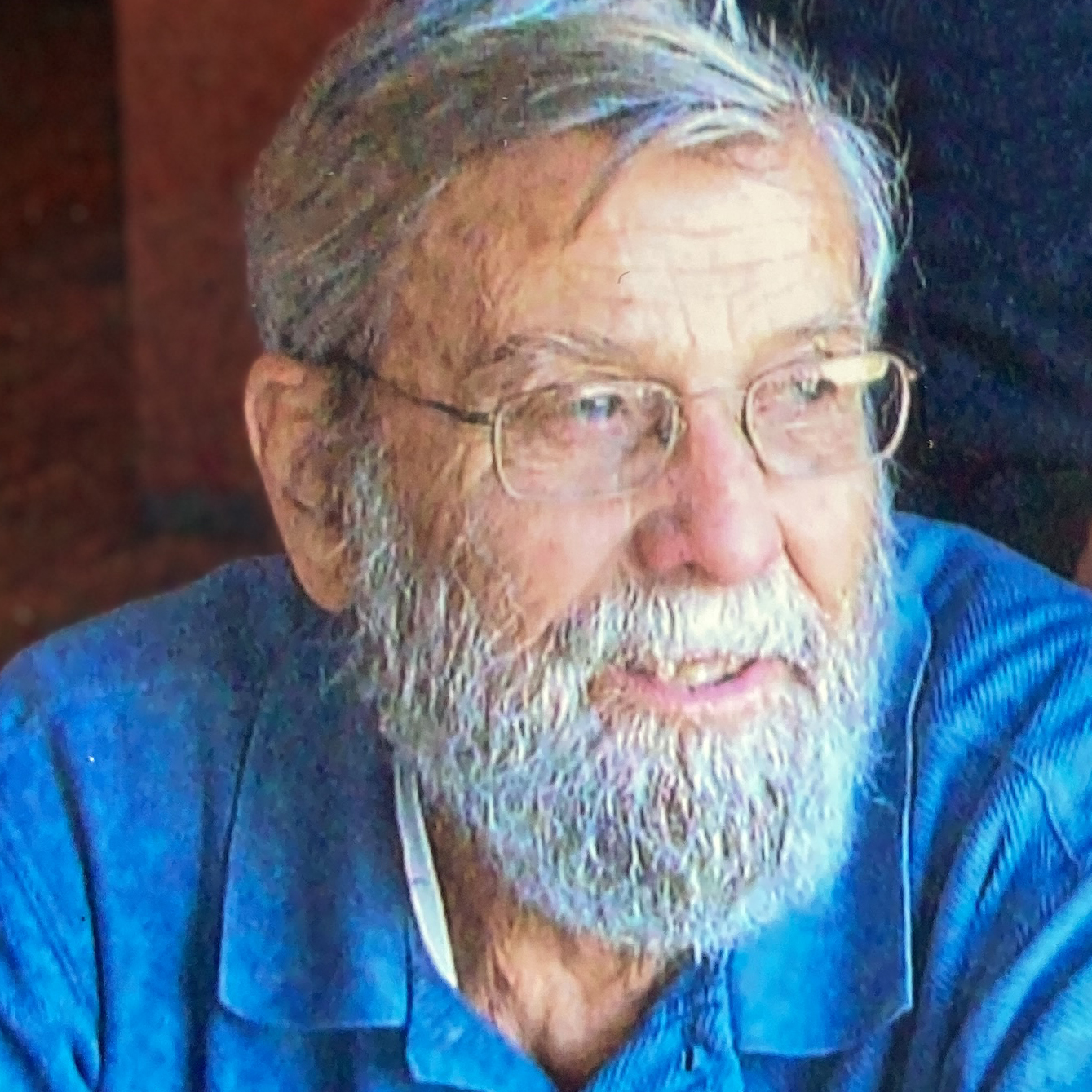
Bob Dale (2010)

In 1986, only a year after its inception of the Maine chapter, Dale joined the Veterans for Peace organization. and was highly involved in activism and protesting war.

In 1988 Dale journeyed to Canton, China, where in 1953, he flew simulated atom bomb attacks in Japan, Canton being his actual target had the order been given. During this journey to Canton, Dale came to terms with his past and realized that peace was his passion.

In 1996 Dale married Jean Parker while on vacation in Mexico, legalizing their marriage in the states on 3 December 1996, and became stepfather to her five children. Dale and Parker lived on Hockomock Island, in Woolwich, Maine.

During the sea trials of the research vessel Hero, Dale fell in love with Maine's coast. Finding a forested island in Hockomock Bay Woolwich, he built by hand, a self-sustaining solar-powered log home. While living on the island, Dale and Parker grew their own food and lived off the grid.

On 22 June 2020, Dale died at his home in Brunswick, Maine. His ashes were spread over Hockomock Island, Woolwich, Maine.

== Awards and honors ==
During his Military Service, Dale was awarded the following.

1st Row	Navy and Marine Corps Commendation Medal	American Campaign Medal	World War II Victory Medal
2nd Row	Navy Occupation Service Medal	National Defense Service Medal	Antarctica Service Medal

- Dale Glacier namesake

== Publications ==
=== Self-published books ===
- Dale, Bob (2014). A Journey Toward Peace.
- Dale, Bob; Parker, Jean (2016). On the Road with Jean and Bob.

=== Scientific publications ===
- Dale, Robert L. (1968). "International Weddell Sea Oceanographic Expedition-1968". Antarctic Journal of the United States. 3 (4): 80–84.
