= Heroin (disambiguation) =

Heroin is an opioid drug, but the term may also refer to:

- Heroin (band), a hardcore punk band
- Heroin (Heroin album)
- Heroin (Z-Ro album), 2010
- "Heroin" (The Velvet Underground song), 1967
- "Heroin" (Buck-Tick song), a 1997 single by Buck-Tick
- "Heroin / Never Never", a 1998 single by Human Drama
- "Heroin", a song by Superpitcher
- "Heroin", a song by Lana Del Rey from Lust for Life
- "Heroin", an unreleased song by SZA
- Addicted (web series), also known as Heroin

== See also ==
- Heroine (disambiguation)
- Heroina (fish), a genus of fish belonging to the family Cichlidae
