= Heroes =

A hero is one who displays courage and self-sacrifice for the greater good.

Heroes or Héroes may also refer to:

== Film ==
- Heroes (1977 film), an American drama
- Heroes (2008 film), an Indian Hindi film

== Gaming ==
- Heroes of Might and Magic or Heroes, a series of video games
- Heroes of the Storm or Heroes, a 2015 video game
- Heroes (role-playing game) (1979)
- Sonic Heroes, a 2003 video game in the Sonic the Hedgehog franchise

== Literature ==
- Heroes (comics), a 1996 comic book by DC Comics
- Heroes (novel), 1998, by Robert Cormier
- Heroes (play), a translation by Tom Stoppard of Le Vent Des Peupliers by Gérald Sibleyras
- Heroes: Saving Charlie, a 2007 novel based on the American TV series Heroes
- Heroes, a role-playing game magazine by Avalon Hill
- Heroes, a 2018 collection of stories from ancient Greek mythology by Stephen Fry
- Heroes, a 2024 novel by Alan Gratz

== Music ==
=== Albums ===
- Heroes (Michael Ball album) (2011)
- Heroes (David Benoit album) (2008)
- Heroes (Johnny Cash and Waylon Jennings album) (1986)
- Heroes (Commodores album) (1980)
- Heroes (Gil Evans and Lee Konitz album), an album recorded in 1980 and released in 1991
- Heroes (HOCC album) (2009)
- Heroes (Icehouse album) (2004)
- Heroes (J. J. Johnson album) (1998)
- Heroes (Willie Nelson album) (2012)
- Heroes (Mark O'Connor album) (1993)
- Heroes (Paul Overstreet album) (1991)
- Heroes (Sabaton album) (2014)
- "Heroes" (album), by David Bowie (1977)
  - Symphony No. 4 (Glass) or "Heroes" Symphony, a symphony by Philip Glass inspired by the album
- War Child Presents Heroes (2009)
- Heroes: Original Soundtrack, a 2008 soundtrack album from the American TV series
  - Heroes: Original Score (2009)

=== Songs ===
- "'Heroes'" (David Bowie song) (1977)
- "Heroes" (Amanda Cook song) (2015)
- "Heroes" (Flying Lotus song) (2019)
- "Heroes" (Tee Grizzley song) (2019)
- "Heroes" (Mika song) (2012)
- "Heroes" (Paul Overstreet song) (1991)
- "Heroes" (Helena Paparizou song) (2006)
- "Heroes" (Shinedown song) (2006)
- "Heroes" (Tinie Tempah song) (2013)
- "Heroes" (Conchita Wurst song) (2014)
- "Heroes" (Måns Zelmerlöw song) (2015)
- "Heroes" (Macklemore song) (2023)
- "Heroes (We Could Be)", a 2014 song by Alesso
- "Heroes", a 2008 song by David Cook from David Cook
- "Heroes", a 1997 song by Roni Size & Reprazent from New Forms
- "Heroes", a 2011 song by All Time Low from Dirty Work
- "Heroes", a 2022 song by Ben Rector from The Joy of Music

=== Performers ===
- Heroes (Australian band), 1980s band
- Héroes del Silencio or Héroes, a Spanish rock band
- Heroes, a British band formed by Wang Chung member Darren Costin

== Sports ==
- Kiwoom Heroes, a South Korean baseball team

== Television ==
=== Series ===
- Heroes (American TV series), a 2006–2010 superhero drama
- Héroes (Chilean miniseries), a 2007 historical drama
- Heroes (New Zealand TV series), a 1984–86 rock band drama
- Heroes (South Korean TV series), a variety show
- Heroes: Legend of the Battle Disks, a 2015 anime series

=== Episodes ===
- "Heroes" (Batman Beyond) (1999)
- "Heroes" (Beavis and Butthead) (1993)
- "Heroes" (Better Off Ted) (2009)
- "Heroes" (CSI: NY) (2006)
- "Heroes" (Our Girl) (2014)
- "Heroes" (The Professionals) (1978)
- "Heroes" (Stargate SG-1) (2004)
- "Heroes", a Thomas & Friends episode (1992)
- "Heroes", an episode of Unforgettable season 1

== Other uses ==
- Heroes (confectionery), a brand of confectionery by Cadbury
- Héroes (TransMilenio), a bus station in Bogotá, Colombia
- Héroes-Canosas (Mexibús), a BRT station in Coacalco de Berriozábal, Mexico
- Los Héroes metro station, in Santiago, Chile
- HEROES Act, proposed American legislation
- Heroes Comics, a Canadian book store

== See also ==
- Hero (disambiguation)
- The Heroes (disambiguation)
- Heroes and Villains (disambiguation)
- Heroes Reborn (miniseries)
- Heros (disambiguation)
- Hero's, a martial arts organization based in Japan
