= RV Hero =

Research vessel

Coordinates: 46.621339°N 123.945491°W

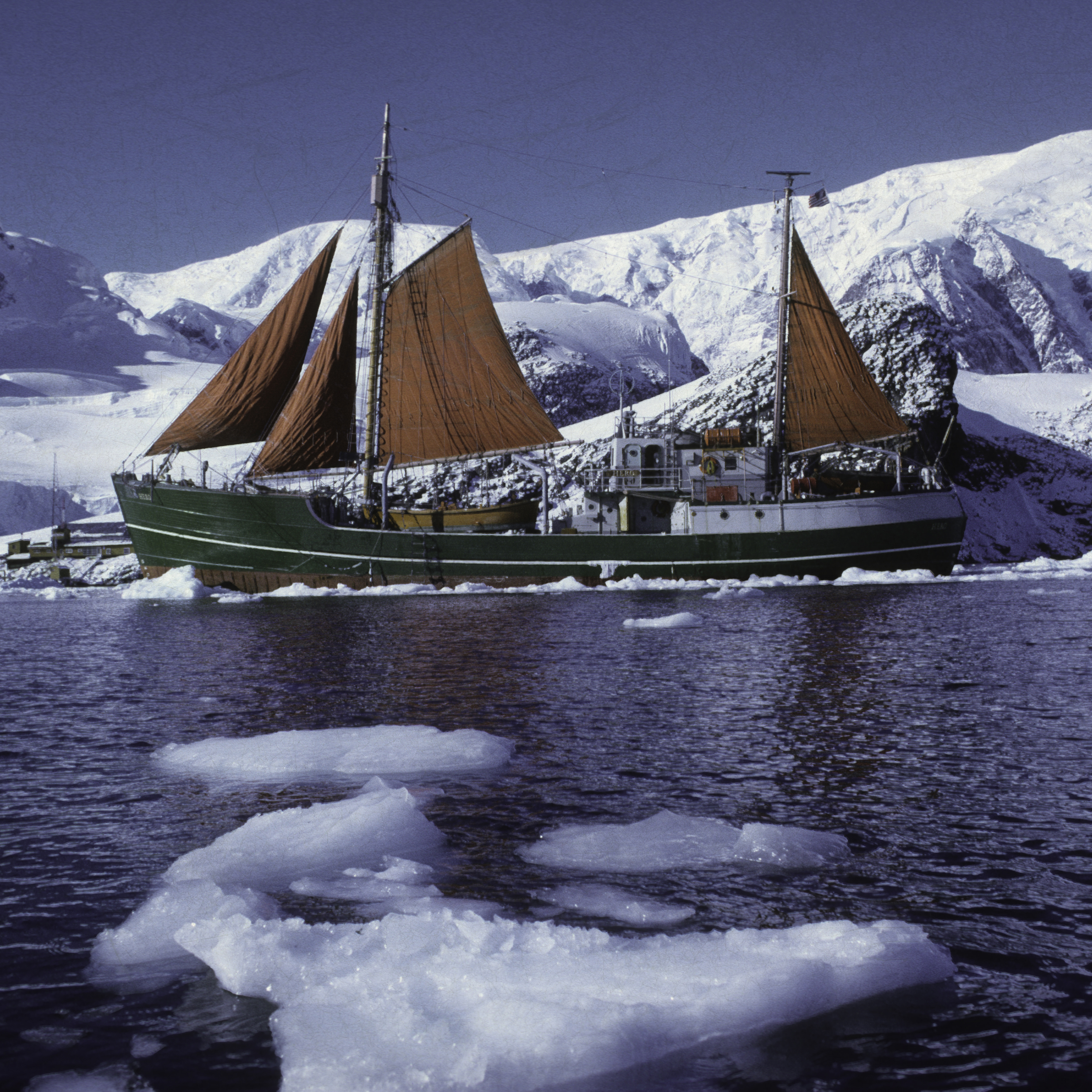
- Hero with all four sails up at Paradise Harbour, Antarctica. c. 1969. Photo by Bob Dale

History

United States
- Namesake: Hero
- Operator: National Science Foundation
- Launched: 1968
- Decommissioned: 1984
- Fate: Partially Sank in 2017

General characteristics
- Type: Research vessel (RV)
- Tonnage: 300 GT
- Length: 125 ft (38 m)
- Beam: 30.33 ft (9.24 m)
- Draft: 12.5 ft (3.8 m)
- Installed power: 760 hp (570 kW)
- Propulsion: Diesel / Sail
- Sail plan: Ketch
- Speed: 11 kn (20 km/h; 13 mph)
- Crew: 10

RV Hero was a research vessel that operated in Antarctica for the National Science Foundation between 1968 and 1984. She was decommissioned in 1984 and partially sank in 2017 after a storm in Bay Center, Washington.

== Design ==
In November 1964 the National Science Foundation commissioned the construction of a wooden shallow draft vessel to enter coastal waters in Antarctica, that larger vessels in service were unable to reach. The contract for the design of Hero was awarded to Potter and M'Arthur, Inc., of Boston, Massachusetts with construction taking place in South Bristol, Maine.

Hero had a two deck wooden oak hull, coated with greenheart for icebreaking. For scientific work, she was outfitted with several laboratories, as well as accommodations for onboard scientists in addition to her normal crew. While primarily powered by a pair of diesel engines, she was rigged as a ketch sailing vessel in order to increase stability and allow for silent running. She was also equipped with several winches and a work boat to support underwater research.

Hero had a gross tonnage of 300, a length of 125 ft (38 m), and a width of 30.33 ft (9.24 m). Her draft was 12.5 ft (3.8 m), and she had two 380 hp (280 kW) engines that allowed it to reach a speed of 11 kn (20 km/h; 13 mph). Including the crew and scientists, the ship had an accompaniment of ten.

== Namesake ==
Hero, was named after the sloop that Nathaniel Palmer sailed when he sighted Antarctica.

== Career ==
Hero was launched in 1968 by the shipyard of Harvey F. Gamage in South Bristol, Maine. Made from Maine oak timbers, Oregon fir, and also tropical greenheart from Guyana, South America.

After finishing her shakedown cruise August 6–26, 1968, she arrived in Antarctica at Palmer Station for the first time on December 25, 1968, and as part of the United States Antarctic Program, for the next sixteen years, she transported scientists around the continent to perform research. Hero was the first vessel to be dedicated full time to scientists at Palmer Station, allowing them access to areas in the field that were previously inaccessible.

=== Operation Deep Freeze ===
During the 1970–1971 season under Operation Deep Freeze Hero saw expeditions to the volcanic eruption at Deception Island, Antarctica. Hero helped a team of scientists who compiled research on dating the various eruptions over the years.

During the 1971–1972 season of Operation Deep Freeze Hero assisted Jacques Cousteau, the famous oceanographer and his ship, the Calypso. Hero was there to supply the Calypso with needed fuel but the next day a crew member was killed by the tail rotor of a tiny helicopter on the stern of the Calypso. Calypso's cruise was abruptly terminated.

Also During Deep Freeze 1971–1972, National Geographic Magazine was on board the Hero writing a story about Palmer Station, Deception Island, and the research vessel.

== Crew ==
Pieter J. Lenie was the captain during the Hero's time in Antarctica. Robert L. Dale was the National Science Foundations liaison through the Office of Polar Programs from 1968–1975. Richard F. Parker served as Hero's chief engineer for a number of years until c. 1983 when he settled in Los Angeles, CA with his wife Abby (who briefly served as Hero's cook).

== Science ==
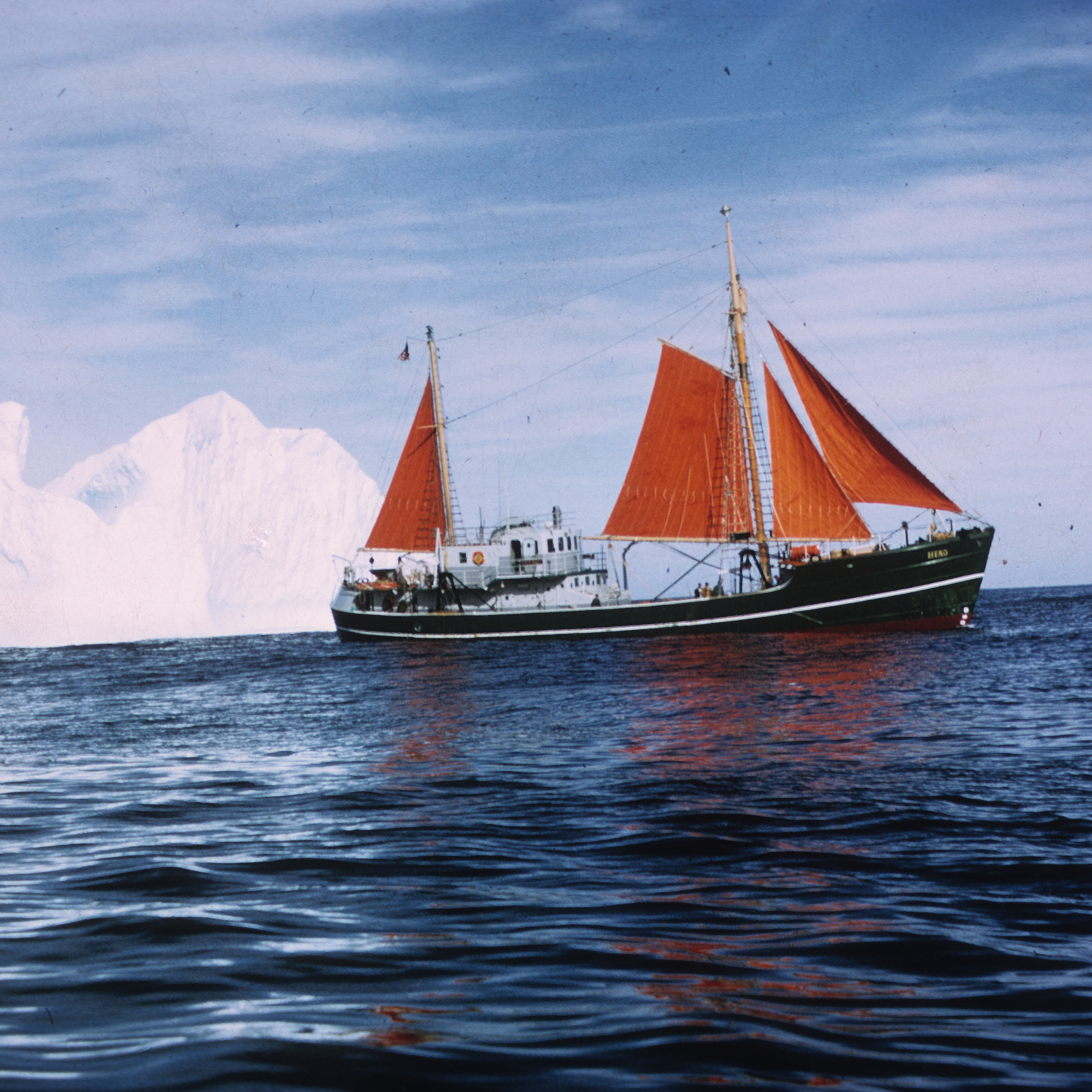
Hero on her shakedown cruise

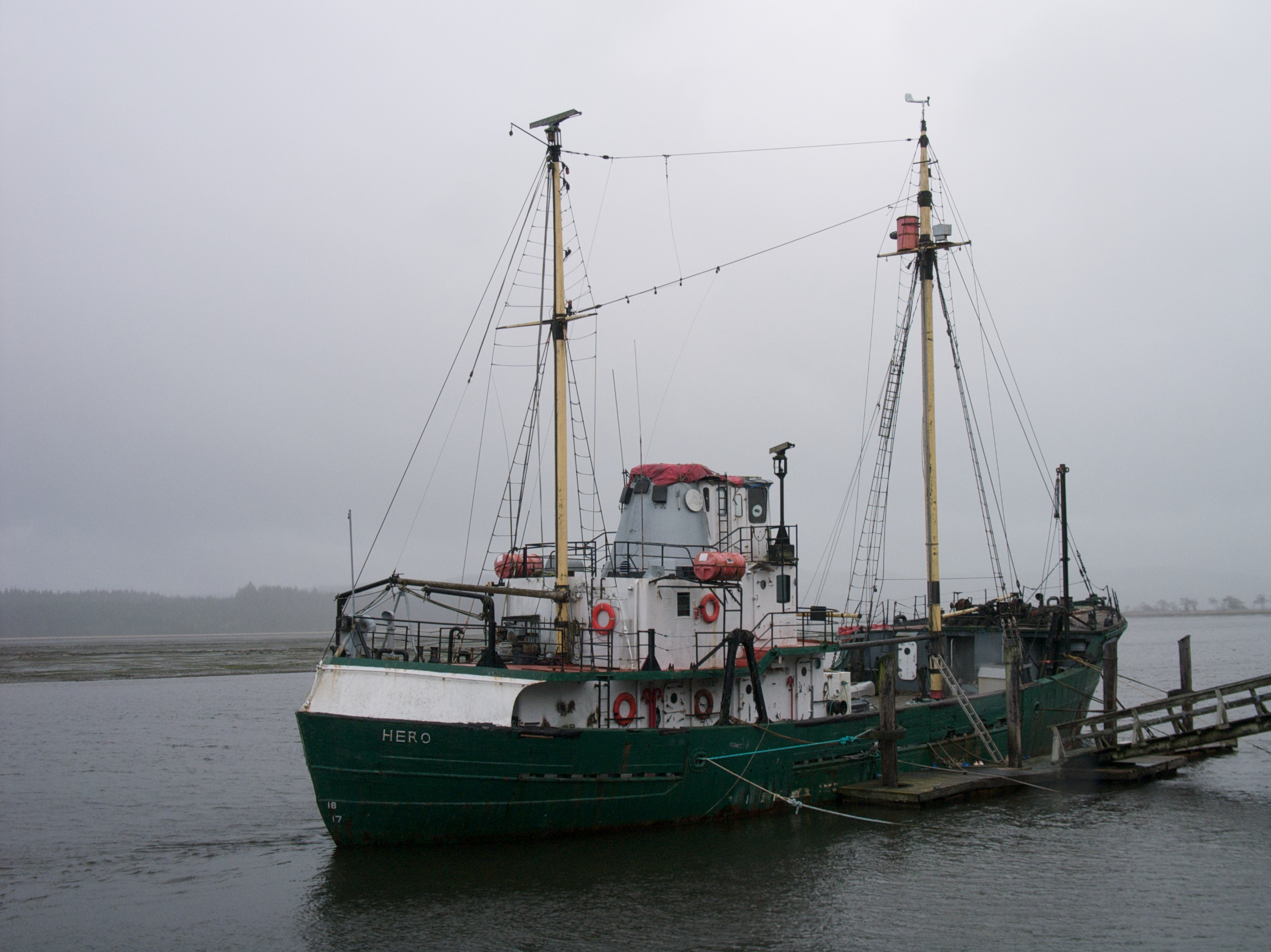

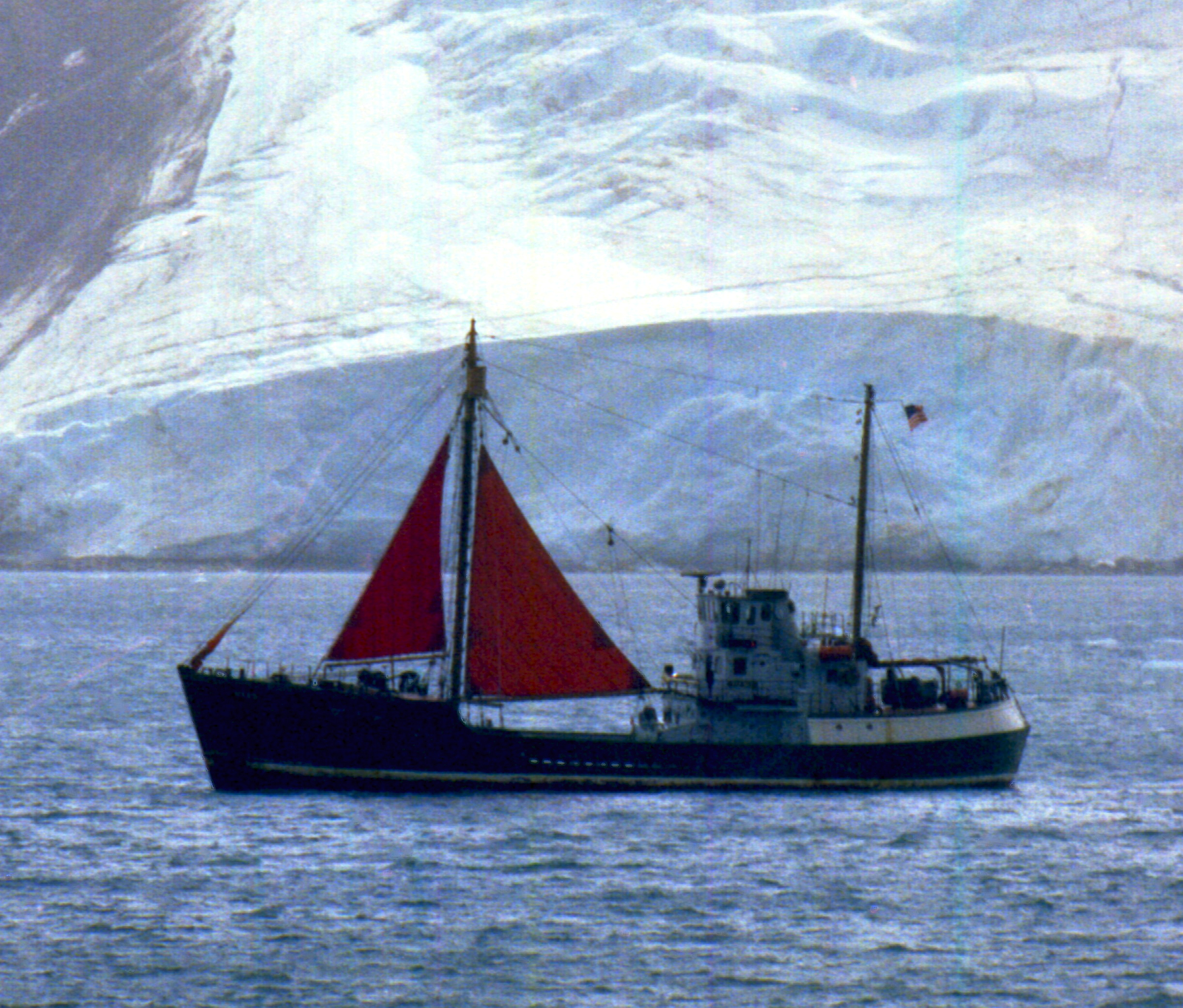

This is a list of scientific explorations that Hero participated in, included a wide range of studies and fields.

- Distribution and variation of marine mammals
- Ichthyology (The study of fish)
- Terrestrial plants
- Soil invertebrates
- Intertidal organisms, infauna
- Geological and geophysical reconnaissance
- Trawling for natural history specimens
- Bird observations
- Reversible freezing in plant tissue
- International volcanology expedition
- Survey of vertebrate, arthropod, and marine biotas
- Bioacoustics of marine mammals, distribution and ecology of marine birds
- Sampling for plankton, bottom life, and bacteria
- Structural geology
- Pollutants in the Peregrine falcon
- Benthic marine algae
- Study of seaweeds
- Sediment sampling
- Ecology of pack ice
- Study of tectonics
- Ecology of benthic fishes and echinoderms
- Oil spill contamination
- Seal studies
- Bathythermographs
- Nitrogen dioxide investigation in the Southern Hemisphere
- Leopard seals in the marine ecosystem
- Sea ice studies
- Whale studies

== Decommission ==
After the 1984 research season, Hero was decommissioned, and acquired by the Port of Umpqua in Reedsport, Oregon for $5,000 after which the nonprofit organization International Oceanographic Hero Foundation was formed by local residents with the intention to restore her into a museum ship. The foundation ran short of money and members, and was unable to find funding to pay for either restoration or maintenance of the vessel, and was dissolved in 1997. After an unsuccessful effort by former Hero crewmember John Morrison to purchase and restore the vessel, she was sold at auction to local fisherman Bill Wechter in 2000, who was able to move Hero to drydock for some restoration, and later moved her to Newport, Oregon. In 2008 she was sold to another local named Sun Feather LightDancer, who moved her to Bay Center, Washington, and intended to restore her but was unable to obtain the required financing. On March 4, 2017, Hero partially sank at her dock in Bay Center after a storm and deconstruction took place in the fall of 2022 removing what was left of the half sunken ship.
