= Hero (son of Priam) =

Greek mythological character

In Greek mythology, Hero was one of the sons of king Priam mentioned in Hyginus's Fabulae, with no mother mentioned.
