= Margarita Spalding Gerry =

American writer

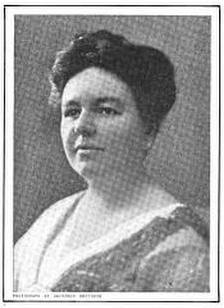
Margarita Spalding Gerry, from a 1913 publication.

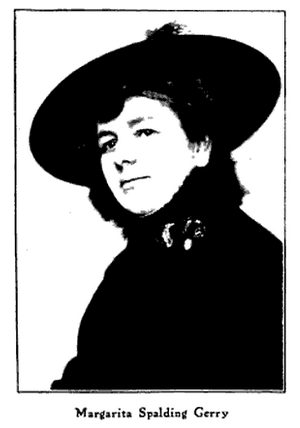
Margarita Spalding Gerry, from a 1917 publication.

Margarita Spalding Gerry (July 28, 1870 — 1939) was an American writer of novels and short stories. She also served on the Board of Education in Washington, D.C.

== Early life ==
Margarita Spalding was born in Washington, D.C., the daughter of Harvey Spalding and Sophia Hutchinson Spalding. She graduated from Wellesley College in 1891.

== Career ==
=== Writing ===
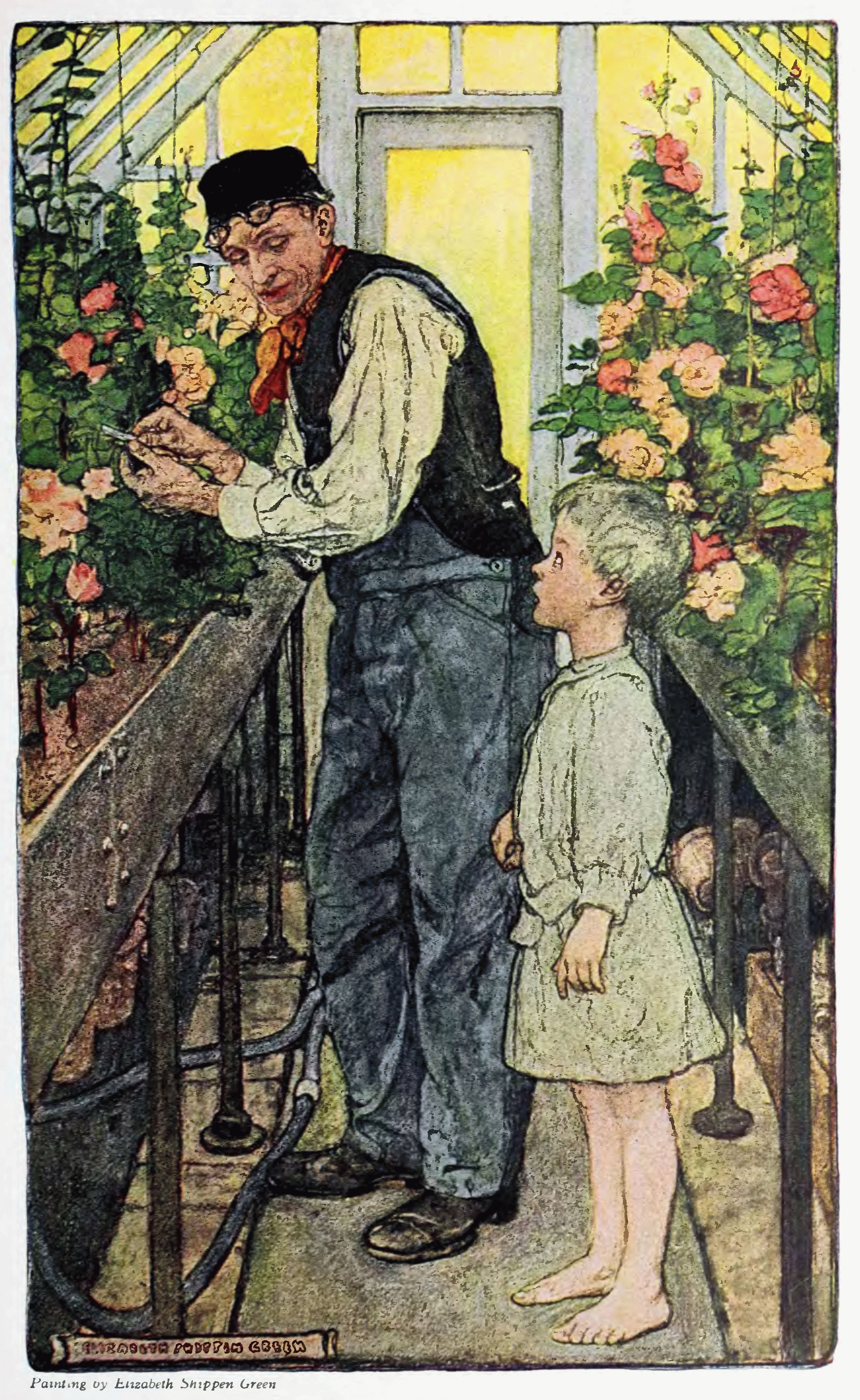
An illustration from Gerry's "The Flowers" Harper's Magazine (1908), by Elizabeth Shippen Green

"I started to write stories because I realized that they were marketable products for which I could receive money", Gerry explained to an interviewer in 1917. Novels by Margarita Spalding Gerry include The Toy Shop (1908), The Masks of Love (1914), The Sound of Water (1914), Philippa's Fortune (1921), Philippa at the Chateau (1922), and Philippa's Experiments (1923). Her serialized The Flowers appeared in Harper's Magazine in 1908, with illustrations by Elizabeth Shippen Green. Similarly, Gerry's As Caesar's Wife appeared in Harper's Magazine in 1911, with illustrations by James Montgomery Flagg, before being published as a volume in 1912. Most of her short stories appeared between 1905 and 1925, in Harper's, though some were instead published in Scribner's and The Smart Set. A collection of her early short stories, Heart and Chart, was published in 1911. Gerry also wrote a non-fiction work, Through Five Administrations: Reminiscences of Colonel William H. Crook, Body Guard to President Lincoln (1910).

=== Board of education ===
Margarita Spalding taught high school for several years before she was married. In 1916, Gerry was appointed to the Board of Education in Washington D.C., and reappointed in 1919. As a self-described progressive member of the board, she testified before a Senate committee in 1920 about a teacher accused of "bolshevism". She resigned from the board in 1921.

== Personal life ==
Margarita Spalding married Philip Fusting Gerry in 1898. They had three children, Harvey, Marjorie, and Philippa, who were all very young when Philip died in 1908. Margarita Spalding Gerry died in 1939, aged 69 years.
