= HMS Heroine =

Four ships of the Royal Navy have borne the name HMS Heroine:

- HMS Heroine (1783) was a 32-gun fifth rate launched in 1783. She was converted into a floating battery in 1803 and was sold in 1806. Because Heroine served in the navy's Egyptian campaign (8 March to 8 September 1801), her officers and crew qualified for the clasp "Egypt" to the Naval General Service Medal, which the Admiralty issued in 1847 to all surviving claimants.
- HMS Heroine was a 32-gun fifth rate launched in 1758 as the 36-gun HMS Venus. She was reduced in 32 guns in 1792 and renamed HMS Heroine in 1809. She was used for harbour service from 1817 and was sold in 1828.
- HMS Heroine (1841) was an 8-gun packet brig launched in 1841. She was used for harbour service from 1865 and broken up in 1878.
- HMS Heroine (1881) was a Satellite-class composite screw corvette launched in 1881 and sold in 1902.

== See also ==
- HMS Hero
