= Hero (Noah song) =

2014 single by Noah

Single by Noah

from the album Second Chance
- Released: 6 August 2014
- Recorded: 2014
- Genre: Pop rock; alternative rock; britpop
- Length: 3:40
- Label: Musica Studio's
- Songwriter(s): Ariel
- Lyricist(s): Giring Ganesha
- Producer(s): Steve Lillywhite

Noah singles chronology
"Ini Cinta" (2014)	"Hero" (2014)	"Seperti Kemarin" (2014)

Music video
- "Hero" on YouTube

"Hero" is a song by Indonesian pop rock band Noah from their 2014 album Second Chance. It was written by Noah's vocalist Ariel and Indonesian musician Giring Ganesha. It is the first song by Noah that has English lyrics. To record the song, Noah worked with British record producer Steve Lillywhite to produce it. The song was released as the lead single of Second Chance on 6 August 2014.

== Writing and recording ==
"Hero" had been written before Noah changed their name from Peterpan. In 2008, Peterpan performed it during a concert in London, England. Its melody is written by the band's vocalist, Ariel. But since Ariel never wrote a song with English lyrics before, Ariel got help from then-Nidji vocalist Giring Ganesha to write the lyrics, because Nidji had written several English songs.

"Hero" as recorded for the Second Chance album was produced by British record producer Steve Lillywhite. When Noah via Musica Studio's asked to collaborate with Lillywhite, "Hero" was one of the songs they sent to him. Lillywhite considered "Hero" as the song that made him realise Noah's potential. While working with Lillywhite, Noah did some experimentation such as using three layers of voice filter to make Ariel's voice cleaner, putting the drums at the corridor and relocating the voice recording location at the studio's corner.

== Music ==
When introduced in June 2014, "Hero" was said to sound Britpop-like, while Steve Lillywhite considered it a rock song. On this song, according to Steve Lillywhite, Ariel's voice sounds more manly compared to his softer voice on other songs. Ariel said that his voice is similar to his voice back when he was singing English songs in cafe.

== Release and promotion ==
"Hero" was introduced during a sharing session in June 2014. "Hero" was released as a single on 6 August 2014 via simultaneous airplay in 174 radios in Indonesia. This airplay was done at 18.08 local time with help from Indonesian Music Director Association. Then, it was released on iTunes on then next day.

== Reception ==
"Hero" won the Best Pop Duo/Group and was nominated for Best Pop Producer/Music Arranger on 18th Annual Anugerah Musik Indonesia on 22 September 2015.

== Music video ==
The music video for "Hero" was directed by Brazilian director Felipe P. Soares. The shooting was done at Rumah Akar, Kota Tua, Jakarta. The video stars Fathir Muchtar portraying a man protecting his family while the band members are performing the song. The music video was released on Musica Studio's YouTube channel on 22 September 2014, the same day as the day Ariel received full release from prison.

== Release history ==
Country	Date	Format	Label	Ref.
Indonesia	6 August 2014	Radio	Musica Studio's	
Various	7 August 2014	Digital download	Musica Studio's	
