= The Heroes =

The Heroes may refer to:

== Film ==
- The Heroes (1916 film), a 1916 short comedy film starring Oliver Hardy
- The Heroes (1973 film), a 1973 film starring Rod Steiger
- The Heroes (1980 film), a 1980 Hong Kong film
- The Heroes (1994 film), a 1994 Italian comedy film

== Literature ==
- The Heroes (1856), a collection of stories based on Greek mythology by Charles Kingsley
- "The Heroes" (1947), a Nelson Algren story in The Neon Wilderness
- The Heroes (1960), a non-fiction book by Ronald McKie
- The Heroes (fantasy novel), a 2011 fantasy novel by Joe Abercrombie

== Television ==
=== Episodes ===
- "The Heroes", Best of British season 1, episode 1 (1987)
- "The Heroes", Starsky & Hutch season 3, episode 8 (1977)
- "The Heroes", The Outcasts episode 6 (1968)
- "The Heroes", The Vital Spark series 2, episode 4 (1967)

=== Shows ===
- The Heroes (miniseries), a 1989 Australian-British television war film based on Operation Jaywick starring John Bach and Jason Donovan
- The Heroes (2008 TV series), a 2008–2022 Iranian television series

== Music ==
- The Heroes (band), a British rock band active in the early 1980s
- "The Heroes" (1998), a song by Shed Seven from the album Let It Ride

== See also ==
- Heroes (disambiguation)
- The Hero (disambiguation)
