= French ship Héros =

A number of ships of the French Navy have borne the name Héros ("hero"). Among them:

- the ship of the line French ship Héros (1701) (1701-1719)
- the 74-gun ship of the line Héros (1750), destroyed at the Battle of Quiberon Bay
- the 74-gun ship of the line Héros, built in 1778, flagship of Suffren, scuttled by British at Toulon in 1793
- the 74-gun Téméraire-class ship of the line Héros (1801)
- the 118-gun Océan-class ship of the line Héros (1813-1828)
- A converted Spanish trailer
- French submarine Le Héros (Q170), a Redoutable-class submarine
