= Heroic =

Heroic may mean:

- characteristic of a hero
- typical of heroic poetry or of heroic verse
- belonging to the Greek Heroic Age
- Heroic (esports), a Norwegian esports organization
- Heroic (horse), a racehorse
- Heroic (film), a 2023 film by David Zonana
