= Herrö =

Herrö may refer to the following places in Sweden:

- Herrö, Nynäshamn Municipality
- Herrö, Härjedalen
