= Hero Online =

2006 video game

Hero Plus
- Developer(s): Netgame
- Publisher(s): Mgame USA Inc.
- Platform(s): Windows 98/ME/2K/XP
- Release: 2006
- Genre(s): MMORPG
- Mode(s): MMO

Hero Plus, previously known as Hero Online, is a free-to-play massively multiplayer online role-playing game (MMORPG) produced by Netgame based on a story written by three generations of Chinese novelists. The game is influenced by wuxia and Asian mythology. The game left beta in July 2006.

== Characters ==
Hero Plus has six "character classes" that players can choose when creating their character. Characters have two genders, each with their own weapon. They include "The Ruthless Blade", who can wield a bow, swords and blades; "The Piercing Eyes", who can use swords, blades, and throwing weapons; "The Overseer of Sky", who can use axes, rods, and spears; "The Elegant Mystic", who uses gauntlets, spears and rods; "The Mystic Muse", who uses dual swords, dual rods, and a large instrument, and "The Monk", who uses rods and destructive spells.

At level 10, players can choose a job class. At level 50, they can embark on a quest for promotion. Players can choose a new class at level 101.

== Character improving ==
Skill points are gained by leveling up. Skills are divided into two groups: skills and passive skills. Skills are learned by reading books that are sold by players and book merchants. Some skills are unique to weapon type and job class, but some higher-level skills can be used by anyone. Certain books can retrieve used skill points.

== Reception ==
Hero Online was successful in early release in China, Japan and Korea. Sergey Vodoleev of 3DNews.ru compared it favorably to Diablo.
