= Hero (sloop) =

The Hero was a tiny sloop, just 44 tons and 47 feet long, captained by 21-year-old Nathaniel Palmer of Stonington, Connecticut, and manned by a crew of four additional men ranging in age from 16 to 31. It was in the Hero that Palmer, in search of as-yet-unknown seal-hunting prospects, stumbled upon Deception Island (in November 1820) and, soon afterward, first sighted the snow-clad mountains of the Antarctic coastline to the south-southeast. Palmer would soon afterward relay his signal discovery to a Russian exploration fleet, which had been sent to the distant southern waters by Alexander I of Russia.

In honor of Palmer's Hero, US National Science Foundation named a research ship for her, RV Hero. The new Hero was a diesel-driven, 125-foot ship, equipped with sails also, which was built for doing research in the waters of the Antarctic Peninsula, from her port at Palmer Station. She was launched from Harvey F. Gamage shipyard in South Bristol, Maine, on March 28, 1968, and sank in 2017.
