= The Heroine (film) =

Unfinished film directed by Orson Welles

- Directed by: Orson Welles
- Screenplay by: Orson Welles
- Based on: The Heroine by Isak Dinesen
- Produced by: Alexander Paal
- Starring: Oja Kodar
- Cinematography: Willy Kurant
- Country: Hungary
- Language: English

The Heroine is an incomplete 1967 film, now lost, that was directed by Orson Welles.

== Plot ==
The film was due to be a one-hour adaptation of an Isak Dinesen story of the same name, from her collection Winter's Tales (1942). It would have starred Oja Kodar as a young French aristocratic widow during the 1870 Franco-Prussian War. After being arrested by the Prussians in Sarre, she would have been allowed to proceed to France, but a Prussian officer would have offered a passport to all the French prisoners if she would come to collect hers naked.

== Production ==
Late in 1966, Welles had filmed another one-hour Karen Blixen adaptation The Immortal Story, for French television. It would not be transmitted (or released in other territories) until 1968, and while editing was still underway on the project, Welles decided to shoot one or two more Blixen stories so that they could be combined with The Immortal Story as a feature-length anthology film, and secure a theatrical release.

The film was financed by London-based Hungarian producer Alexander Paal and the Hungarian state film production board, and Welles brought in cinematographer Willy Kurant, whom he would subsequently work with again on The Deep. The rest of the film crew came from the Hungarian film industry.

Only one day of filming took place on The Heroine, on 14 April 1967, in the opera house of Budapest, using arc lights for the last time in Welles' career. During that day, Welles began to have serious doubts about the technical competence of the Hungarian film crew. Additionally, he was presented with a grossly inflated bill at the end of the day's filming.

Consequently, Welles covertly left the country after just one day's filming, leaving his debts unpaid. The footage has never been found, and is believed lost.
