= Kenneth Brower =

American environmental writer

Kenneth Brower bibliography
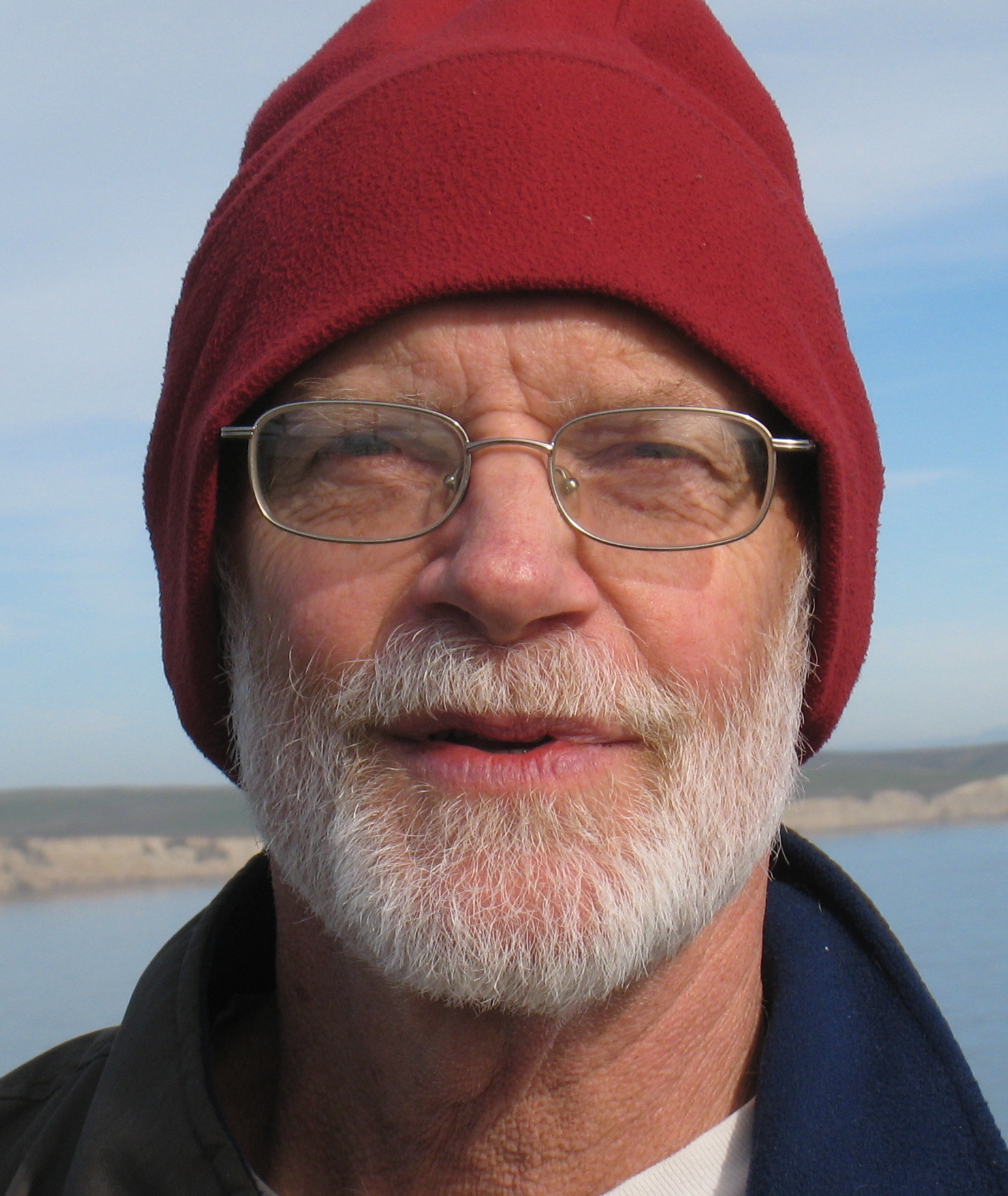
- Kenneth Brower c. 2012
- Books↙: 26

Kenneth Brower is an American writer known for his natural environment writings. His published works include articles with The Atlantic,Smithsonian, Audubon, and several other periodicals.

Brower's articles have appeared in National Geographic, National Geographic Books, National Geographic Traveler, National Geographic History & Culture (online) and National Geographic Adventure.

Brower is the author of several books about environmental issues and natural history, including The Starship and the Canoe (1978) about the physicist Freeman Dyson and his son George Dyson; Freeing Keiko: The Journey of a Killer Whale from Free Willy to the Wild, about the Orca, Keiko, made famous by the film Free Willy; And his book Yosemite: An American Treasure is in over 1,200 WorldCat libraries.

Brower is the oldest son of David Brower, who was a prominent environmentalist and the founder of many environmental organizations. His first job was working as an editor for the Exhibit Format series, published by Sierra Club Books. He also was a contributing author and editor for The Earth's Wild Places series.

Brower's career spans decades, this is list of his published works.

== Bibliography ==
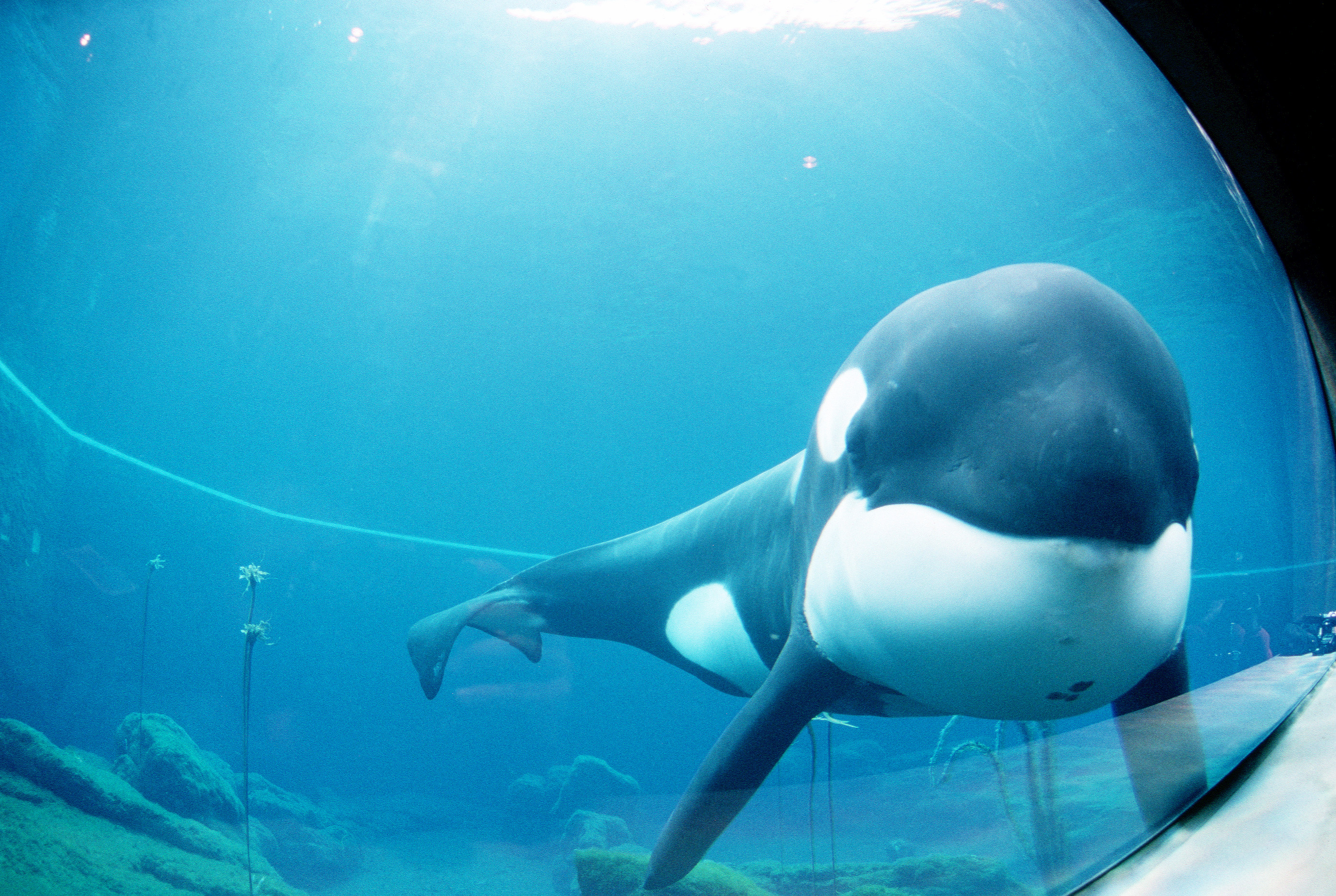
Keiko, an Orca, starred in the film Free Willy and subject of Brower's book Freeing Keiko: The Journey of a Killer Whale from Free Willy to the Wild

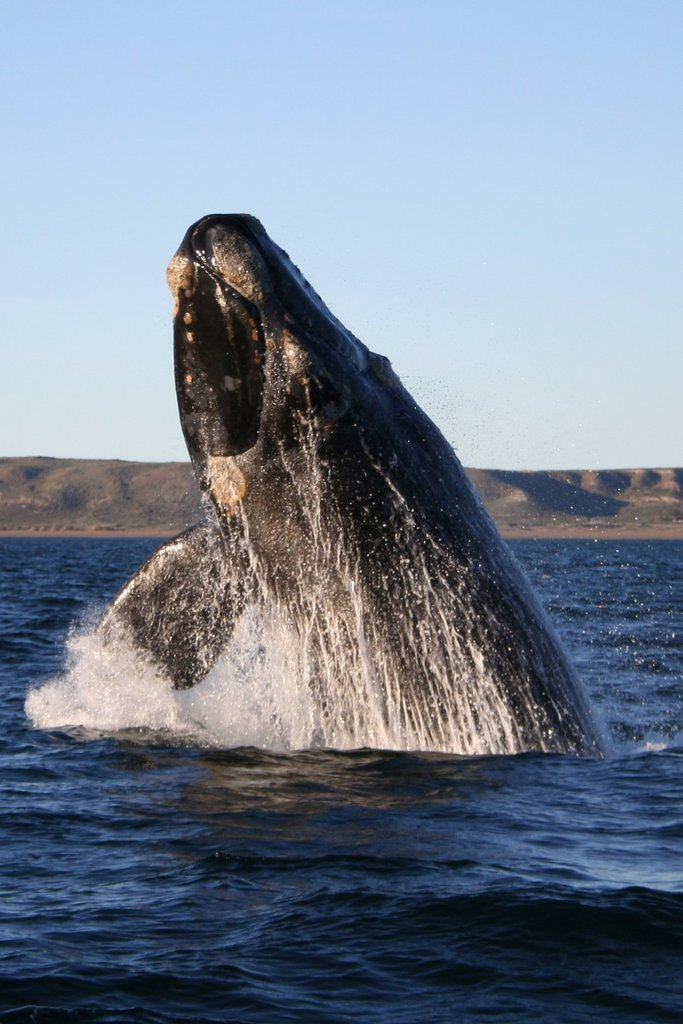
A Southern Right Whale and one of many Marine mammals featured in Brower's book Wake of the Whale

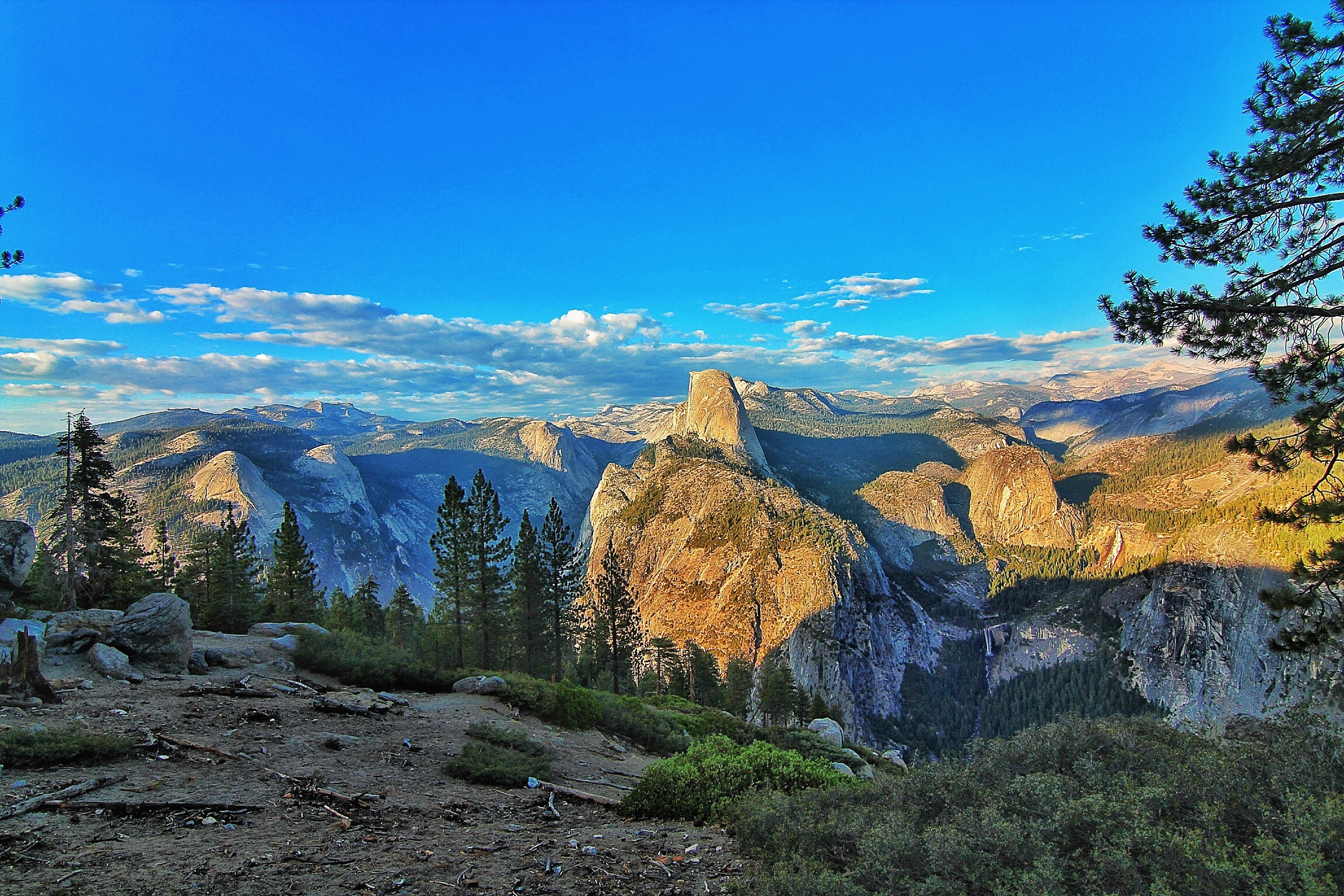
Yosemite National Park and the subject of Brower's book Yosemite: An American Treasure

=== Books ===
Books
Title	Year	Publisher	Ref.
With Their Islands Around Them	1974	Holt, Rinehart and Winston	
The Starship and the Canoe	1978	Holt, Rinehart and Winston	
A Song for Satawal	1983	Harper & Roe	
Yosemite: An American Treasure	1990	National Geographic Society	
One Earth: Photographed by More Than 80 of the World's Best Photojournalists	1990	Collins Publishers	
Realms of the Sea	1991	National Geographic Society	
American Legacy: Our National Forests	1997	National Geographic Society	
The Winemaker's Marsh: Four Seasons in a Restored Wetland	2001	Sierra Club Books; Random House	
Freeing Keiko: The Journey of a Killer Whale from Free Willy to the Wild	2005	Gotham Books	
The Wildness Within: Remembering David Brower	2012	Heyday Books	
Hetch Hetchy: Undoing a Great American Mistake	2013	Heyday Books	
Curtsinger: Reflections on the Life and Adventures of Photographer Bill Curtsinger	2021	Peregrine Press	

=== The Earth's Wild Places series ===
series
Title	Year	Author	Co-author	Editor	Ref.
Maui: The Last Hawaiian Place	1970		✓	✓	
Earth and the Great Weather: the Brooks Range	1971	✓			
The Primal Alliance: Earth and Ocean	1971			✓	
Guale, the Golden Coast of Georgia	1974			✓	
Micronesia: Island Wilderness	1975		✓	✓	
Wake of the Whale	1979	✓			
Micronesia, the Land, the People, and the Sea	1981		✓	✓	

=== Exhibit Format series ===
All books in this series were published by Sierra Club Books

series
Title	Year	Co-author	Editor	Ref.
Not Man Apart: Photographs of the Big Sur Coast	1964		✓	
Everest, the West Ridge	1965		✓	
Navajo Wildlands: As Long as the Rivers Shall Run	1967		✓	
Kauai and the Park Country of Hawaii	1967	✓	✓	
Baja California and the Geography of Hope	1967		✓	
