= Nguyễn Anh Hùng =

Vietnamese footballer

Personal information
- Full name: Nguyễn Anh Hùng
- Date of birth: June 8, 1992 (age 34)
- Place of birth: Vinh, Nghệ An, Vietnam
- Height: 1.70 m (5 ft 7 in)
- Position: Full-back

Team information
- Current team: Hải Phòng
- Number: 2

Youth career
- 2008–2012: Sông Lam Nghệ An

Senior career*
Years	Team	Apps	(Gls)
2013–2014	Hùng Vương An Giang	5	(0)
2015–2018	Hải Phòng	82	(1)
2018–2021	Quảng Nam	41	(0)
2022–	Hải Phòng	14	(0)
- * Club domestic league appearances and goals as of 4 December 2023

Nguyễn Anh Hùng (born 8 June 1992) is a Vietnamese footballer who plays as a full-back for V.League 1 club Hải Phòng.

== Career ==
=== Song Lam Nghe An ===
Nguyen Anh Hung began his career with Song Lam Nghe An. When playing for SLNA, he helifted the 2012 Vietnamese Under-21 Championship. He was released by SLNA at the end of the 2012 season after making no first-team appearances.

=== Hung Vuong An Giang ===
In 2013, Hùng joined V.League 2 club Hùng Vương An Giang. In the 2013 season, He made 13 league appearances, helping the club achieve promotion to the V.League 1.

On 26 February 2014, Hùng suffered a broken right fibula in a match against Song Lam Nghe An, following a tackle by Trần Đình Đồng. He did not play for the club for the remainder of the season.
