= Heroes (role-playing game) =

Heroes is a role-playing game published by Tabletop Games (U.K.) in 1979.

== Description ==
Heroes is set in Europe in the Dark Ages, oriented more toward campaigns than individual characters; the systems draw heavily on miniatures rules. It is a historic game without fantasy elements.

== Publication history ==
Heroes was designed by Dave Millward and published by Tabletop Games in 1979 as an 80-page book. It has been republished in 2012 by ECW Role Play Games.
