= Robert E. Gilka =

American photojournalist

- Born: July 12, 1916 near Milwaukee, Wisconsin, United States
- Died: June 25, 2013 (aged 96); Arlington, Virginia, United States
- Occupation: Photojournalist
- Agent: National Geographic
- Spouse: Janet (deceased)
- Children: 4

Robert E. Gilka (July 12, 1916 – June 25, 2013) was an American photojournalist best known for being an editor and director of photography at National Geographic for 27 years (1958–1985).

== Biography ==
Robert Gilka was born in 1916 near Milwaukee, Wisconsin. Gilka graduated from Marquette University in 1939 with a degree in journalism. Upon graduation, he published a four-page tabloid sized job description called "The Gilka Graphic", a chronicle of his experience and qualifications, which he sent to several hundred editors around the country. The job market was still at a depression low and he was hired by the Zanesville, Ohio Signal newspaper as a general reporter, sports editor, and photographer. At the Signal, he met and married Janet Andrews Bailey, a reporter at the Zanesville Signal in 1941. Their four children are Greer, Jena, Geoffrey, and Gregory. Janet died in 2004. Gilka died at the age of 96 in an Arlington, Virginia hospice on June 25, 2013, after his third bout of pneumonia that year.

== Career ==
World War II interrupted Gilka’s Zanesville career. He volunteered for the Signal Corps, in which he expected to be a photographer. Instead the Army made him an X-ray technician in the medical corps. He served in both the Pacific and European theaters and rose from private to captain.

After his discharge in 1945, Gilka was offered a managing editor’s job in Zanesville but turned it down to go back to his home town and work as a copy editor and sports writer for the Milwaukee Journal. His continuing interest in photography propelled him to the picture desk, which he took over in 1952.

Gilka was invited to join the staff of the National Geographic in 1958 and, after a stint as a picture editor, was named director of photography in 1963. In that role, he was responsible for making the photographic assignments for all the Society’s books and magazines. He pioneered a summer intern program for university students who sought careers in photojournalism. Scores went through the program. Some became staff members; others are on newspaper staffs scattered around the country. He also nurtured and hired photographers he met as a member of the University of Missouri photojournalism workshop faculty for nearly 50 years. For 17 years he was in charge of the Hearst annual photojournalism contest.

== Gilka's Gorillas ==
Words of encouragement from Bob Gilka were responsible for the development of dozens of photographers. During his years at National Geographic, they became known as "Gilka’s Gorillas"—probably a result of Jane Goodall, naming one of her research chimps (Gilka) after him. At the Geographic he was a staunch supporter of photographers while they traveled throughout the world. He was often willing to defend expense account items such as "Cessna 185 aircraft" (the whole plane—not a rental) or obscure items such as "Mouse for rattlesnake, house for mouse, cheese for mouse."

He had a sense of humor that often perplexed new photographers and visitors. On his office door a sign read "Wipe knees before entering"—next to his desk was a confessional kneeling bench.

Photojournalist Ted Spiegel said of him, "Gilka understood empowerment before it was a buzz word. An assignment from Gilka endowed you with unique opportunities and empowered you to probe with responsibility."

While at the Geographic, magazine circulation rose from less than 2 million to over 10 million.

He retired from National Geographic in 1985 and served as an adjunct professor of photojournalism at Syracuse University until 1992.
