= Antarctic Journal of the United States =

Scientific journal

- Subject: Antarctica
- Peer-reviewed: No
- Language: English

Publication details
- History: 1966–2002
- Publisher: National Science Foundation, Office of Polar Programs (United States)

Standard abbreviations
- ISO 4: Antarct. J. U. S.

Indexing
- ISSN: 0003-5335

Links
- Journal homepage

The Antarctic Journal of the United States was a scientific journal that covered American research activities in Antarctica and its neighboring regions. It was published by the National Science Foundation's Office of Polar Programs and ran from 1966 to 2002. Although it was not peer-reviewed, it provided insights into the work being done in the area.

The journal was preceded by four other publications:

- Antarctic Status Report USNC-IGY (1956-1958)
- Bulletin of the U.S. Antarctic Projects Officer (1959-1965)
- Antarctic Status Report (1962-1963)
- Antarctic Report (1964-1965)
