= Hiroki =

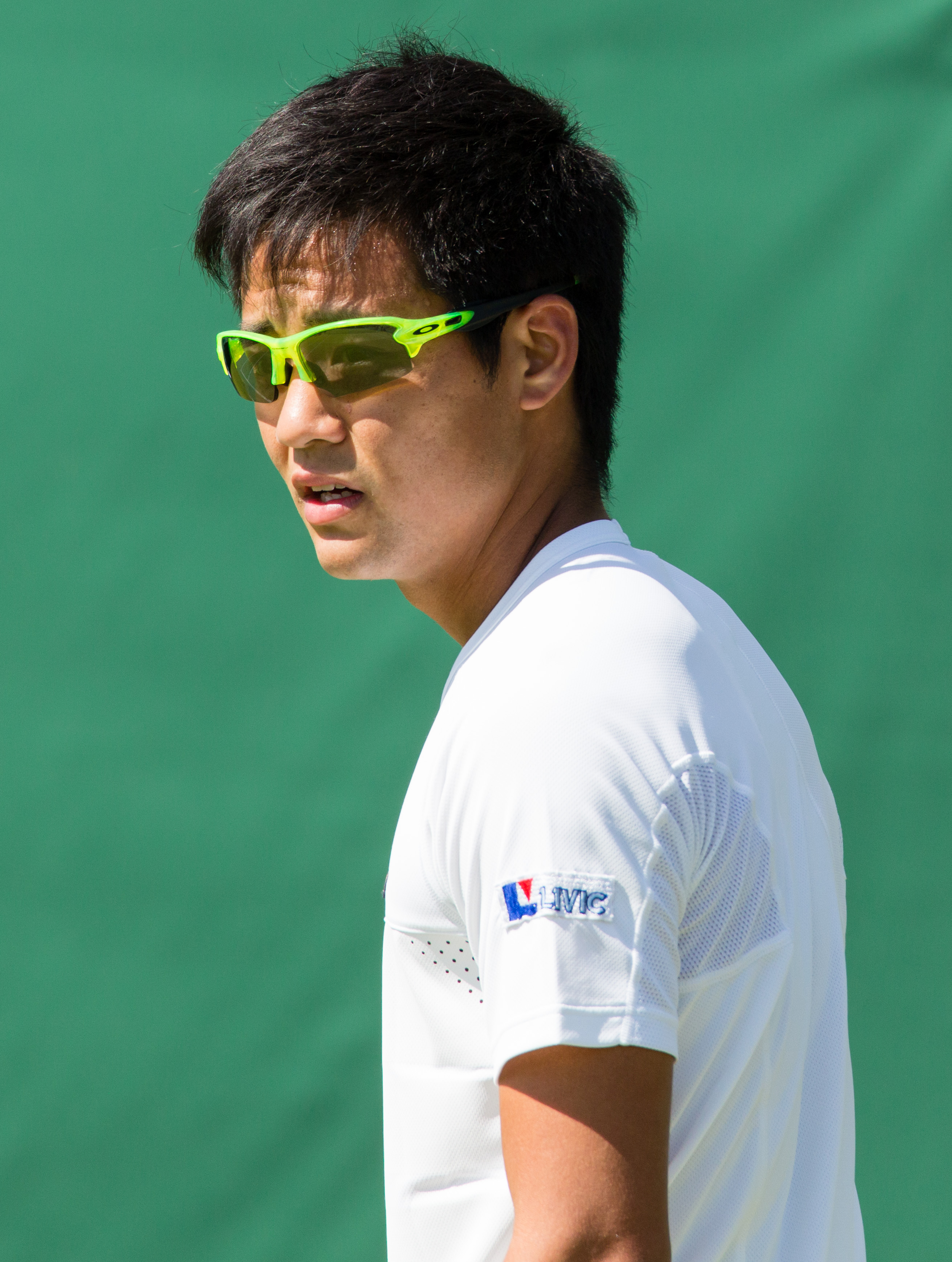
- Hiroki Moriya, a Japanese tennis player
- Pronunciation: Hí-rò-kí. Can have different pronunciations depending on the language used.
- Gender: Male
- Language: Japanese

Origin
- Origin: Japan
- Meaning: Multiple different meanings depending on the kanji used

Other names
- Related names: Hiro, Hiroaki, Hirooki, Hiroshi, Hiroko, Hiroka, Hiroyuki

Hiroki (ひろき, ヒロキ) is a common masculine Japanese given name. It can be written in many ways. In the following lists, the kanji in parentheses are the individual's way of writing the name Hiroki.

== Written forms ==
Hiroki can be written using different kanji characters and can mean:

- 弘樹, "vast tree, great tree, generous tree, great establish"
- 宏樹, "wide tree, large tree, wide establish"
- 博紀, "fair chronicle"
- 浩紀, "vigorous, chronicle"
- 博希, "ample hope"
- 大樹, "great tree"

== People with the name ==
- Hiroki Abe (安部 裕葵; born 1999), Japanese footballer
- Hiroki Aiba (弘樹; born 1987), Japanese actor, dancer, and singer
- Hiroki Aikawa (愛川 ヒロキ; born 1963), Japanese music artist and composer
- Hiroki Akimoto (秋元 皓貴; born 1992), Japanese martial artist and kickboxer
- Hiroki Akino (秋野 央樹; born 1994), Japanese footballer
- Hiroki Akiyama (秋山 裕紀; born 2000), Japanese footballer
- Hiroki Aratani (荒谷 弘樹; born 1975), Japanese football
- Asanoyama Hiroki (朝乃山 広暉; born 1994), Japanese sumo wrestler
- Hiroki Azuma (浩紀; born 1971), Japanese cultural critic
- Hiroki Azuma (footballer) (東 博樹; born 1966), Japanese footballer
- Hiroki Bandai (萬代 宏樹; born 1986), Japanese football player
- Hiroki Endo (浩輝), Japanese manga artist
- Hiroki Doi (土井 洋輝; born 1999), Japanese actor
- Hiroki Fujiharu (藤春 廣輝; born 1988), Japanese footballer
- Hiroki Fujita (藤田弘輝; born 1986), head coach of the Sendai 89ers
- Hiroki Fuwa (不破 弘樹; born 1966), Japanese sprinter
- Hiroki Gotō (後藤 ヒロキ; born 1985), Japanese voice actor
- Hiroki Hasegawa (長谷 川博己, born 1977), Japanese stage, film, and television actor
- Hiroki Hasegawa (baseball) (長谷川 宙輝, born 1998), Japanese baseball player
- Hiroki Hayashi (林 宏樹), Japanese animator
- Hiroki Hokama (弘樹; born 1983), Japanese singer from the rock band Orange Range
- Hiroki Ichigatani (市ヶ谷 廣輝, born 1969), Japanese fencer
- Hiroki Iijima (飯島 寛騎, born 1996), Japanese actor
- Hiroki Iikura (大樹; born 1986), Japanese professional footballer
- Hiroki Iizuka (shogi) (飯塚 祐紀; born 1969), Japanese shogi player
- Hiroki Ino (猪野広樹; born 1992), Japanese actor
- Hiroki Ioka (井岡 弘樹; born 1969), Japanese boxer
- Hiroki Ishii (石井 宏樹; born 1979), Japanese lightweight kickboxer
- Hiroki Ito (disambiguation), multiple people
- Hiroki Hattori (服部 浩紀; born 1971), Japanese football player and manager
- Hiroki Higuchi (樋口 寛規; born 1992), Japanese football player
- Hiroki Hikida (疋田浩気; born 1972), Japanese triathlete and open water swimmer
- Hiroki Hirako (平子 裕基; born 1982), Japanese speed skater
- Hishofuji Hiroki (湯原 祐希; born 1989), Japanese sumo wrestler
- Hiroki Kamemoto (亀本 寛貴; born 1990), Japanese musician
- Hiroki Kanno (菅野 宏紀; born 1965), Japanese character designer, anime artist
- Hiroki Kasahara (kickboxer) (笠原 弘希; born 1999), Japanese kickboxer
- Hiroki Kato (加藤 広樹; born 1986), Japanese footballer
- Hiroki Kikuta (裕樹; born 1962), Japanese video game composer and designer
- Hiroki Kishida (岸田 裕樹; born 1981), Japanese football player
- Hiroki Kobayashi (小林 弘記; born 1977), Japanese footballer
- Hiroki Kobayashi (footballer, born 1992), Japanese footballer
- Hiroki Kokubo (小久保 裕紀; born 1971), Japanese baseball player
- Hiroki Kondo (disambiguation), multiple people
- Hiroki Konno (今野 浩喜; born 1978), Japanese comedian and actor
- Hiroki Kosai (洋樹; born 1933), Japanese astronomer
- Hiroki Kotani (born 1971), Japanese mixed martial artist
- Hiroki Kotani (footballer) (小谷 光毅; born 1993), Japanese footballer
- Hiroki Kawano (河野 広貴; born 1990), Japanese football
- Hiroki Kita (北博樹; born 1969), Japanese mixed martial artist
- Hiroki Kurimoto (栗本 広輝; born 1990), Japanese footballer
- Hiroki Kuroda (博樹; born 1975), Japanese professional baseball player
- Hiroki Maeda (前田 紘基; born 1998), Japanese footballer
- Hiroki Maekawa (前川 紘毅; born 1985), Japanese singer
- Hiroki Matsueda (松枝 博輝; born 1993), Japanese long-distance runner
- Hiroki Matsubara (松原 浩樹; born 1973), Japanese football player
- Hiroki Matsukata (弘樹; born 1942), Japanese actor
- Hiroki Mawatari (馬渡 洋樹; born 1994), Japanese footballer
- Hiroki Mihara (三原 廣樹; born 1978), Japanese footballer
- Hiroki Miyazawa (宮澤 裕樹; born 1989), Japanese footballer
- Hiroki Momose (百瀬 大騎; born 1997), Japanese baseball player
- Hiroki Minei (嶺井 博希; born 1991), Japanese baseball player
- Hiroki Miura (三浦宏規; born 1999), Japanese actor
- Hiroki Mizuhara (水原 大樹; born 1975), Japanese football player
- Hiroki Mizumoto (水本 裕貴; born 1985), Japanese football player
- Hiroki Motoki (元木 博紀; born 1992), Japanese handball player
- Hiroki Muto (武藤 弘樹; born 1997), Japanese archer
- Hiroki Morinoue (ヒロキ モリノーエ; born 1947), American artist of impressionism
- Hiroki Moriuchi (寛樹; born 1994), Japanese singer from the rock band MY FIRST STORY
- Hiroki Moriya (守屋 宏紀; born 1990), Japanese tennis player
- Hiroki Nakadoi (中土居宏宜; born 1985), Japanese singer and actor
- Hiroki Nakajima (中島 弘貴; born 1988), Japanese welterweight kickboxer
- Hiroki Nakata (宏樹; born 1964), Japanese shogi player
- Hiroki Nakazawa (仲澤 広基; born 1987), Japanese professional baseball infielder
- Hiroki Nakayama (中山 博貴; born 1986), Japanese football player
- Hiroki Nanami (七海ひろき; born 1984), Japanese actress, singer, voice actor
- Hiroki Narabayashi ((奈良林寛紀; born 1988), Japanese football player
- Hiroki Narimiya (寛貴; born 1982), Japanese actor
- Hiroki Nishimura (西村 大輝; born 1994), Japanese cyclist
- Hiroki Noda (野田 裕喜; born 1997), Japanese footballer
- Hiroki Nomura (野村 弘樹; born 1969), Japanese baseball pitcher
- Hiroki Ogita (荻田 大樹; born 1987), Japanese pole vaulter
- Hiroki Oka (岡 大生; born 1988), Japanese football player
- Hiroki Okamura (岡村 洋輝; born 1998), Japanese badminton player
- Hiroki Okuda (奥田 裕貴; born 1992), Japanese footballer
- Hiroki Omori (大森 啓生; born 1990), Japanese footballer
- Hiroki Ohnishi (大西 広樹; born 1997), Japanese baseball player
- Hiroki Ono (尾野 弘樹; born 1992), Japanese motorcycle racer
- Hiroki Otsu (大津 弘樹; born 1994), Japanese race driver
- Hiroki Ueda (上田 泰己; born 1975), Japanese professor of biology
- Hiroki Ueno (baseball) (上野 大樹; born 1986), Japanese former professional baseball pitcher
- Hiroki Ueno (ice hockey) (上野 拓紀; born 1986), Japanese professional ice hockey winger
- Hiroki Sakai (酒井 宏樹; born 1990), Japanese footballer
- Hiroki Sanada (真田 裕貴; born 1984), Japanese baseball player
- Hiroki Sasaki (佐々木 宏樹; born 1993), Japanese footballer
- Hiroki Sasase (笹瀬 弘樹; born 1989), Japanese pole vaulter
- Hiroki Sasahara (笹原 廣喜; born 1974), Japanese paralympian athlete
- Hiroki Sato (佐藤 博紀; born 1982), Japanese basketball player and executive
- Hiroki Shibuya (渋谷 洋樹; born 1966), Japanese football player and manager
- Hiroki Shida (信太 弘樹; born 1989), Japanese handball player
- Hiroki Shimowada (born 1976), Japanese voice actor
- Hiroki Shinjo (新條 宏喜; born 1973), Japanese football player
- Hiroki Shishido (大樹; born 1977), Japanese welterweight shoot-boxer
- Hiroki Sugajima (菅嶋 弘希; born 1995), Japanese footballer
- Hiroki Suzuki (disambiguation), multiple people
- Hiroki Tachiyama (立山 広喜; born 1985), Japanese judoka
- Hiroki Takahashi (広樹; born 1974), Japanese voice actor
- Hiroki Tanaka (田中 寛己; born 1991), Japanese footballer
- Hiroki Taniai (谷合 廣紀; born 1994), Japanese shogi player
- Hiroki Tōchi (東地 宏樹; born 1966), Japanese actor, narrator
- Hiroki Todaka (戸高 弘貴; born 1991), Japanese footballer
- Hiroki Wada (弘樹), Japanese composer and arranger also known as H-Wonder
- Hiroki Yasumoto (洋貴; born 1977), Japanese voice actor
- Ryūichi Hiroki (廣木 隆一; born 1954), Japanese film director
- Hiroki Uchi (博貴; born 1986), Japanese idol singer and actor
- Hiroki Uchida (内田 大貴; born 1990), Japanese footballer
- Hiroki Uemoto (上本 博紀; born 1986), Japanese baseball player
- Hiroki Waki (脇 裕基; born 1993), Japanese football player
- Hiroki Watanabe (渡辺 宏樹; born 1988), Japanese sprint canoeist
- Wakatsutomu Hiroki (わかつとむ ひろき; born 1973), Japanese sumo wrestler
- Hiroki Yagami (八神 ひろき; born 1966), Japanese manga artist
- Hiroki Yamada (disambiguation), multiple people
- Hiroki Yamagishi (山岸 宏貴; born 1991), Japanese long-distance runner
- Hiroki Yamamoto (disambiguation), multiple people
- Hiroki Yokoyama (disambiguation), multiple people
- Hiroki Yoshimoto (吉本 大樹; born 1980), Japanese race car driver
- Hiroki Yuhara (湯原 祐希; born 1984), Japanese rugby union player
- Hiroki Yuma (廣木雄磨; born 1992), Japanese footballer

== Fictional characters ==
- Hiroki, also known as Buzz or Jake, a character in the Ape Escape series
- Hiroki, the main character in the video game Trek to Yomi
- Hiroki Awano, an antagonist in the video game Yakuza 0
- Hiroki Ishiyama, a supporting character in Code Lyoko in which he is younger brother of fourteen-year-old Yumi, the loyal fan-wielding and telekinetic Lyoko Warrior
- Hiroki Kamijo, a character in Junjo Romantica
- Hiroki Senō, called Hiro, the protagonist and hero of the anime film Venus Wars
- Hiroki Sugimura, a character in the Battle Royale novel and film
- Hiroki Takasugi, a star baseball player in the anime Princess Nine

== See also ==
- Hirooki, a masculine Japanese given name
