= Hiroyuki =

- Pronunciation: IPA: [çiɾoꜜjɯki]
- Gender: Male
- Language: Japanese

Origin
- Origin: Japan
- Meaning: Multiple different meanings depending on the kanji used
- Region of origin: Japan

Other names
- Related names: Hiro, Yuki, Hiroaki, Hiroki

Hiroyuki (ひろゆき, ヒロユキ) is a common masculine Japanese given name.

== Written forms ==
Hiroyuki can be written using different kanji characters and can mean: extensive, good fortune, spacious.

博之, 博行, 博幸, 裕之, 裕幸, 洋之, 洋行, 寛之, 寛幸, 寛征, 広之, 広行, 広幸, 弘之, 弘行, 弘幸, 弘介, 宏之, 宏行, 宏幸, 啓之, 浩之, 浩行, 浩幸, 祐征, 大由, 公行, 宏由樹, 弘友希.

It is written in hiragana as ひろゆき and in katakana as ヒロユキ.

== People with the name ==
Notable people with the name include:

- Hiroyuki (artist) (ヒロユキ; born 1982), Japanese manga artist
- Hiroyuki Abe (fighter) (阿部 裕幸; born 1970), Japanese mixed martial artist
- Hiroyuki Abe (footballer) (阿部 浩之; born 1989), Japanese footballer
- Hiroyuki Agawa (阿川 弘之; 1920–2015), Japanese writer
- Hiroyuki Akatsuka (赤塚 裕幸; born 1940), Japanese sport shooter
- Hiroyuki Akimoto (秋本 啓之; born 1986), Japanese judoka
- Hiroyuki Akitani (秋谷 裕幸; born 1963), Japanese linguist
- Hiroyuki Arai (荒井 広幸; born 1958), Japanese politician
- Hiroyuki Asada (浅田 弘幸; born 1968), Japanese manga artist
- Hiroyuki Dobashi (土橋 宏由樹; born 1977), Japanese footballer
- Hiroyuki Ebihara (海老原 博幸; 1940–1991), Japanese boxer
- Hiroyuki Endo (遠藤 大由; born 1986), Japanese badminton player
- Hiroyuki Enoki (榎 洋之; born 1979), Japanese boxer
- Hiroyuki Fujita (藤田 寛之; born 1969), Japanese golfer
- Hiroyuki Furuta (古田 寛幸; born 1991), Japanese footballer
- Hiroyuki Goto (後藤 裕之; born 1973), Japanese video game designer
- Hiroyuki Hamada (martial artist) (1925–2003), Japanese karateka
- Hiroyuki Hayashi (athlete) (林 弘幸; born 1973), Japanese sprinter
- Hiroyuki Hayashi (footballer) (林 祐征; born 1983), Japanese footballer
- Hiroyuki Hayashi (musician) (ハヤシ ヒロユキ; born 1978), Japanese musician
- Hiroyuki Hisataka (久高 寛之; born 1985), Japanese boxer
- Hiroyuki Hosoda (細田 博之; 1944–2023), Japanese politician
- Hiroyuki Igarashi (五十嵐 広行; born 1969), Japanese dancer and record producer
- Hiroyuki Ikeuchi (池内 博之; born 1976), Japanese actor
- Hiroyuki Imai (今井 博幸; born 1970), Japanese cross-country skier
- Hiroyuki Imaishi (今石 洋之; born 1971), Japanese animator and anime director
- Hiroyuki Inagaki (稲垣 博行; born 1970), Japanese footballer
- Hiroyuki Isagawa (伊差川 浩之; born 1953), Japanese powerlifter
- Hiroyuki Ishida (石田 博行; born 1979), Japanese footballer
- Hiroyuki Isobe (磯部 寛之; born 1982), Japanese musician
- Hiroyuki Ito (伊藤 裕之), Japanese video game director, designer and producer
- Hiroyuki Iwaki (岩城 宏之; 1932–2006), Japanese conductor and percussionist
- Hiroyuki Iwatsuki (岩月 博之; born 1970), Japanese video game composer
- Hiroyuki Izumi (和泉 博幸; born 1965), Japanese sprint canoeist
- Hiroyuki Jo (徐 裕行), yakuza member
- Hiroyuki Kaidō (海童 博行), Japanese manga artist
- Kaiō Hiroyuki (魁皇 博之; born 1972), Japanese sumo wrestler
- Katō Hiroyuki (加藤 弘之; 1836–1916), Japanese academic and politician
- Hiroyuki Kajihara (梶原 宏之; born 1966), Japanese rugby union player
- Hiroyuki Kakudō (角銅 博之; born 1959), Japanese anime director
- Hiroyuki Kawahara (川原 弘之; born 1991), Japanese baseball player
- Hiroyuki Kawazoe (川添 博幸; born 1952), Japanese modern pentathlete
- Hiroyuki Kimura (木村 浩之; born 1965), Japanese video game designer
- Hiroyuki Kinoshita (木下 浩之; born 1958), Japanese actor and voice actor
- Hiroyuki Kitakubo (北久保 弘之; born 1963), Japanese animator, anime director and screenwriter
- Hiroyuki Kitazume (北爪 宏幸; born 1961), Japanese animator, manga artist and illustrator
- Hiroyuki Kiyokawa (清川 浩行; born 1967), Japanese footballer and manager
- Hiroyuki Kobayashi (baseball) (小林 宏之; born 1978), Japanese baseball player
- Hiroyuki Kobayashi (footballer) (小林 宏之; born 1980), Japanese footballer
- Hiroyuki Kobayashi (producer) (小林 裕幸; born 1972), Japanese video game and anime producer
- Hiroyuki Komoto (河本 裕之; born 1985), Japanese footballer
- Hiroyuki Konishi (gymnast) (小西 裕之; born 1963), Japanese gymnast
- Hiroyuki Matsumoto (松本 浩幸; born 1989), Japanese footballer
- Hiroyuki Matsuura (松浦 弘幸; born 1937), Japanese ice hockey player
- Hiroyuki Miura (shogi) (三浦 弘行; born 1974), Japanese shogi player
- Hiroyuki Miura (ice hockey) (三浦 浩幸; born 1973), Japanese ice hockey player
- Hiroyuki Miyasako (宮迫 博之; born 1970), Japanese actor and comedian
- Hiroyuki Morioka (森岡 浩之; born 1962), Japanese writer
- Hiroyuki Morita (森田 宏幸; born 1964), Japanese animator and anime director
- Hiroyuki Nagahama (長浜 博行; born 1958), Japanese politician
- Hiroyuki Nagao (長尾 寛征; born 1980), Japanese slalom canoeist
- Hiroyuki Nagato (長門 裕之; 1934–2011), Japanese actor
- Hiroyuki Nakajima (中島 裕之; born 1982), Japanese baseball player
- Hiroyuki Nakajo (中條 公行; 1946–2020), Japanese sport shooter
- Hiroyuki Nakano (中野 裕之; born 1958), Japanese film director
- Hiroyuki Nakano (athlete) (born 1988), Japanese sprinter
- Hiroyuki Namba (難波 弘之; born 1953), Japanese musician
- Hiroyuki Nasu (那須 博之; 1952–2005), Japanese film director
- Hiroyuki Nishijima (西嶋 弘之; born 1982), Japanese footballer
- Hiroyuki Nishimori (西森 博之; born 1963), Japanese manga artist
- Hiroyuki Nishimura (西村 博之; born 1976), founder of 2channel, owner of 4chan
- Hiroyuki Nishiuchi (西内 洋行; born 1975), Japanese triathlete
- Hiroyuki Okiura (沖浦 啓之; born 1966), Japanese animator and anime director
- Hiroyuki Omata (尾亦 弘友希; born 1983), Japanese footballer
- Hiroyuki Omichi (大道 広幸; born 1987), Japanese footballer
- Hiroyuki Onoue (尾上 寛之; born 1985), Japanese actor
- Hiroyuki Owaku (大和久 宏之; born 1975), Japanese video game writer
- Hiroyuki Oze (小瀬 浩之; 1985–2010), Japanese baseball player
- Hiroyuki Saeki, Japanese badminton player
- Sagatsukasa Hiroyuki (磋牙司 洋之; born 1981), Japanese sumo wrestler
- Hiroyuki Sakaguchi (坂口 裕之; born 1965), Japanese baseball player
- Hiroyuki Sakai (坂井 宏行; born 1942), Japanese chef
- Hiroyuki Sakashita (坂下 博之; born 1959), Japanese footballer
- Hiroyuki Sanada (真田 広之; born 1960), Japanese actor
- Hiroyuki Sano (佐野 浩之; born 1968), Japanese pole vaulter
- Hiroyuki Sasaki (佐々木 裕之; born 1956), Japanese geneticist
- Hiroyuki Sawada (澤田 博之; born 1974), Japanese footballer
- Hiroyuki Sawano (澤野 弘之; born 1980), Japanese composer and musician
- Hiroyuki Shibata (柴田 博之; born 1963), Japanese long jumper
- Hiroyuki Shirai (白井 博幸; born 1974), Japanese footballer
- Hiroyuki Sonoda (園田 博之; 1942–2018), Japanese politician
- Hiroyuki Sugimoto (杉本 裕之; born 1986), Japanese footballer
- Hiroyuki Suzuki (architectural historian) (鈴木 博之; 1945–2014), Japanese architectural historian
- Hiroyuki Suzuki (figure skater) (鈴木 弘幸; born 1959), Japanese figure skater and coach
- Hiroyuki Suzuki (yo-yo performer) (鈴木 裕之; born 1989), Japanese yo-yo performer
- Cary-Hiroyuki Tagawa (田川 洋行; 1950–2025), Japanese-born actor
- Hiroyuki Takahashi (game producer) (高橋 宏之; born 1957), Japanese video game producer and writer
- Hiroyuki Takami (貴水 博之; born 1969), Japanese singer and actor
- Hiroyuki Takasaki (高崎 寛之; born 1986), Japanese footballer
- Hiroyuki Takaya (高谷 裕之; born 1977), Japanese mixed martial artist
- Hiroyuki Takeda (武田 博行; born 1983), Japanese footballer
- Hiroyuki Takei (武井 宏之; born 1972), Japanese manga artist
- Hiroyuki Tajima (田嶋 宏行; 1911–1984), Japanese printmaker
- Hiroyuki Tamakoshi (玉越 博幸), Japanese manga artist
- Hiroyuki Tani (谷 博之; born 1943), Japanese politician
- Hiroyuki Taniguchi (谷口 博之; born 1985), Japanese footballer
- Hiroyuki Tanuma (田沼 広之; born 1973), Japanese rugby union player
- Hiroyuki Terada (寺田 弘行; born 1968), Japanese sushi chef
- Teruzakura Hiroyuki (照櫻 弘行; born 1947), Japanese sumo wrestler
- Hiroyuki Togashi (born 1955), Japanese politician
- Hiroyuki Tominaga (富永 啓之; born 1973), Japanese basketball player
- Hiroyuki Tomita (冨田 洋之; born 1980), Japanese gymnast
- Hiroyuki Usui (碓井 博行; born 1953), Japanese footballer and manager
- Hiroyuki Utatane (うたたね ひろゆき; born 1966), Japanese manga artist and anime director
- Hiroyuki Wakabayashi (若林 広幸; born 1949), Japanese architect
- Hiroyuki Watanabe (渡辺 裕之; 1955–2022), Japanese actor
- Hiroyuki Yabe (矢部 浩之; born 1971), Japanese comedian
- Hiroyuki Yamaga (山賀 博之; born 1962), Japanese anime director
- Hiroyuki Yamamoto (wheelchair racer) (山本 浩之; born 1979), Japanese wheelchair racer
- Hiroyuki Yamamoto (footballer) (山本 寛幸; born 1979), Japanese footballer
- Hiroyuki Yamamoto (composer) (山本 裕之; born 1967), Japanese composer
- Hiroyuki Yokoo, Japanese voice actor
- Hiroyuki Yoshida (吉田 裕幸; born 1969), Japanese footballer
- Hiroyuki Yoshiie (義家 弘介; born 1971), Japanese politician
- Hiroyuki Yoshino (吉野 裕行; born 1974), Japanese voice actor
- Hiroyuki Yoshino (screenwriter) (吉野 弘幸; born 1970), Japanese screenwriter

== Fictional characters ==
- Hiroyuki Kurusu, a midfielder footballer character in the Days (manga)
- Hiroyuki, Fūsuke's pet penguin in the Ninku manga series
- Hiroyuki Igawa, one of main characters of the manga Ten (manga)
- Hiroyuki Misawa, a character in Ultraman Nexus
