= Hiroaki =

- Pronunciation: hi-ro-a-ki
- Gender: Male

Origin
- Origin: Japanese
- Meaning: Different meanings depending on the kanji used

Other names
- Related names: Hiroshi, Hiroki, Hirooki, Hiroko, Hiroka, Hiro

Hiroaki is a masculine Japanese given name. It can be written in many ways. In the following lists, the kanji in parentheses are the individual's way of writing the name Hiroaki.

== Written forms ==
Forms in kanji can include

- 広明, 広朗, 寛明, 寛晃, 宏昭, 宏哲, 宏章, 宏晃, 宏明, 紘彰, 廣明, 廣彰, 博明, 博昭 博亮, 拓晃, 裕明, 裕亮, 祥朗, 弘毅, 弘明, 弘昭, 浩明, 浩昭, 浩章, 洸彬, 公明, 泰明, 亘哲 or 大晃)

== People with the name ==
- Hiroaki Abe (阿部 弘毅; 1889–1949), Japanese admiral
- Hiroaki Aoki (青木 廣彰; 1938–2008), Japanese businessman
- Hiroaki Asano (浅野 博亮; born 1990), Japanese volleyball player
- Hiroaki Doi (土井 宏昭; born 1978), Japanese hammer thrower
- Hiroaki Endo (遠藤 寛明; born 1986), Japanese politician
- Hiroaki Fujii (藤井 宏昭), Japanese diplomat
- Hiroaki Fushimi (伏見宮 博明王; born 1932), Japanese prince
- Hiroaki Gōda (合田 浩章; born 1965), Japanese anime director and screenwriter
- Hiroaki Hidaka (日高 広明; 1962–2006), Japanese serial killer
- Hiroaki Hiraoka (平岡 拓晃; born 1985), Japanese judoka
- Hiroaki Hiraoka (footballer) (平岡 宏章; born 1969), Japanese footballer
- Hiroaki Hirata (平田 広明; born 1963), Japanese voice actor
- Hiroaki Ishiura (石浦 宏明; born 1981), Japanese racing driver
- Hiroaki Izumikawa (泉川 寛晃; born 1957), Japanese modern pentathlete
- Hiroaki Kadoyama (門山 宏哲; born 1964), Japanese politician
- Hiroaki Kamijo (上條 宏晃; born 1989), Japanese footballer
- Hiroaki Kitano (北野 宏明; born 1961), Japanese scientist
- Hiroaki Kumon (公文 裕明; born 1966), Japanese footballer
- Hiroaki Kunitake (国武 大晃; born 2002), Japanese snowboarder
- Hiroaki Matsuda (松田 亘哲; born 1997), Japanese baseball player
- Hiroaki Matsuyama (松山 博明; born 1967), Japanese footballer and manager
- Hiroaki Mitsuya (満屋 裕明; born 1950), Japanese virologist
- Hiroaki Miura (三浦 祥朗; born 1977), Japanese voice actor
- Hiroaki Morino (born 1934), Japanese potter
- Hiroaki Morishima (森島 寛晃; born 1972), Japanese footballer
- Hiroaki Murakami (村上 弘明; born 1956), Japanese actor
- Hiroaki Nagasawa (長沢 広明; born 1958), Japanese politician
- Hiroaki Namba (難波 宏明; born 1982), Japanese footballer
- Hiroaki Okuno (footballer) (奥埜 博亮; born 1989), Japanese footballer
- Hiroaki Okuno (volleyball) (奥野 浩昭; born 1960), Japanese volleyball player
- Hiroaki Sakurai (桜井 弘明), Japanese anime director
- Hiroaki Samura (沙村 広明; born 1970), Japanese writer and illustrator
- Hiroaki Sato (figure skater) (佐藤 洸彬; born 1995), Japanese figure skater
- Hiroaki Sato (footballer) (佐藤 弘明; 1932–1988), Japanese footballer
- Hiroaki Sato (translator) (佐藤 紘彰; born 1942), Japanese poet and translator
- Hiroaki Serizawa (芹澤 廣明; born 1948), Japanese singer-songwriter
- Hiroaki Shukuzawa (宿澤 広朗; 1950–2006), Japanese rugby union player and coach
- Hiroaki Suga (菅 裕明; born 1963), Japanese chemist
- Hiroaki Suzuki (鈴木 博昭; born 1984), Japanese shoot boxer
- Hiroaki Tajima (田島 宏晃; born 1974), Japanese footballer
- Hiroaki Takahashi (高橋 宏明; born 1976), Japanese judoka
- Hiroaki Takami (高見 公明; born 1960), Japanese boxer
- Hiroaki Takaya (高谷 裕亮; born 1981), Japanese baseball player
- Hiroaki Tōno (東野 弘昭; 1939–2025), Japanese Go player
- Hiroaki Tsutsumi (堤博明; born 1985), Japanese musician and composer
- Hiroaki Yamakage (山影 博明; born 1974), Japanese speed skater
- Hiroaki Yokoyama (横山 泰明; born 1980), Japanese shogi player
- Hiroaki Yura (由良 浩明; born 1981), Japanese violinist
- Hiroaki Zakōji (座光寺 公明; 1958–1987), Japanese composer and pianist

== See also ==
- 6975 Hiroaki, a main-belt asteroid
- 宏哲 (disambiguation)
- 寛明 (disambiguation)
