= Hiromi (given name) =

- Pronunciation: Hí-rò-mí
- Gender: Unisex

Origin
- Origin: Japanese
- Meaning: Generous beauty (寛美) although it can have other meanings depending on the kanji used
- Region of origin: Japan

Other names
- Related names: Hiro, Hiroko, Hiroka, Hiroki

Hiromi (Japanese: ひろみ, ヒロミ, 裕美, 博美, 弘美, 広海, 広美) is a Japanese given name that can be given to males or females.

== Name meanings ==
Hiromi can be written using different kanji characters and can mean:

- 寛美, "Generous beauty"
- 弘美, "Wide beauty"
- 博美, "Exposition beauty"
- 浩美, "Prosperous beauty"
- 宏美, "Vast beauty"

== People with the name ==
Notable people with the name include:

- Hiromi Uehara, also known as Hiromi, (上原 ひろみ, born 1979), Japanese jazz composer and pianist
- Hiromi (comedian), (ヒロミ, born 1965), Japanese comedian and television personality
- Hiromi (model) (新畑 博美, born 1990), Japanese fashion model
- Hiromi Amada (天田 ヒロミ, born 1973), Japanese kickboxer
- Romi Dames born Hiromi Dames (born 1979), Japanese-American actress
- Hiromi Go (郷 ひろみ, born 1955), Japanese pop singer famous during the 1970s
- Hiromi Goto (born 1966), Japanese-Canadian novelist
- Hiromi Haneda (羽田 裕美; born 1981), Japanese pianist
- Hiromi Hara (原 博実, born 1958), Japanese former football player
- Hiromi Hayakawa (1982-2017), Mexican singer
- Hiromi Hirata (平田 宏美, born 1978), Japanese voice actress and singer
- Hiromi Igarashi (五十嵐 裕美, born 1986), Japanese voice actress
- Hiromi Itō (伊藤 比呂美, born 1955), Japanese writer
- Hiromi Iwasaki (singer) (岩崎 宏美, born 1959), Japanese musician and singer
- Hiromi Kaneko (金子 広美; born 1980), Japanese cyclist
- Hiromi Katsura (桂 宏美, born 1975), Japanese singer
- Hiromi Kawabata (川畑 宏美; born 1979), Japanese basketball player
- Hiromi Kawakami (川上 弘美, born 1958), Japanese writer
- Hiromi Kobayashi (golfer) (小林 浩美, born 1963), Japanese LPGA golfer
- Hiromi Konno (今野 宏美, born 1975), Japanese voice actress
- Hiromi Makihara (槙原 寛己, born 1963), Japanese baseball pitcher
- Hiromi Matsunaga (松永 裕美, born 1984), Japanese professional ten-pin bowler
- Hiromi Matsuura (松浦 ひろみ, born 1984), Japanese singer and AV idol
- Hiromi Miyake (三宅 宏実, born 1985), Japanese weightlifter
- Hiromi Nagasaku (永作 博美, born 1970), Japanese actress, pop singer and former member of the Jpop group Ribbon
- Hiromi Nakakura (中倉 宏美; born 1979), Japanese shogi player
- Hiromi Nakashima (中島 宏海; born 1993), Japanese footballer
- Hiromi Oka, (岡 裕己, born 1993), Japanese baseball player
- Hiromi Oshima (大島 浩美, born 1980), Japanese erotic model and former playmate
- Hiromi Ōta (太田 裕美, born 1955), Japanese musician, singer and former idol
- Hiromi Ōtsu (大津 広美, born 1984), Japanese speed skater
- Hiromi Ozawa (小沢 洋美; born 1961), Japanese speed skater
- Hiromi Seino-Suga (清野-菅 弘美, born 1973), Japanese biathlete
- Hiromi Shinya (新谷 弘実, 1935–2021), Japanese gastroenterologist
- Hiromi Suzuki (illustrator) (鈴木 博美), Japanese illustrator
- Hiromi Suzuki (athlete) (鈴木 博美, born 1968), Japanese long-distance runner who competed in both the 1992, and the 1996 Summer Olympics
- Hiromi Takeuchi (竹内 洋美; born 1966), Japanese speed skater
- Hiromi Taniguchi (谷口 浩美, born 1960), Japanese former long-distance runner
- Hiromi Tsuru (鶴 ひろみ, 1960–2017), Japanese voice actress
- Hiromi Wada (和田 博実, 1937–2009), Japanese baseball player
- Hiromi Yamada (山田 宏巳, born 1953), Japanese chef
- Hiromi Yamamoto (山本 宏美; born 1970), Japanese speed skater
- Hiromi Yanagihara (柳原 尋美, 1979–1999), Japanese pop singer and founding member of Country Musume
- Hiromi Yoshida (吉田 博美; 1949–2019), Japanese politician

== Fictional characters ==
- Hiromi Amachi (Patricia Richardson in the english dub), a character in Tekkaman: The Space Knight
- Hiromi Fujimori, a character in Angelic Layer
- Hiromi Higa, a character in SK8 the Infinity
- Hiromi Higuruma, a character in Jujutsu Kaisen
- Hiromi Kadota, a character in Kamen Rider Revice
- Hiromi Nase, a character in Beyond the Boundary
- Hiromi Oka, a character in Aim for the Ace!
- Sakurai Hiromi, a character in

1997 drama Beach Boys

- Hiromi Shiota, a character in Assassination Classroom
- Hiromi Sugita, a character in Boku Dake ga Inai Machi
- Hiromi Tachibana, a character in Beyblade
- Hiromi Yamazaki, a character in Patlabor
- Hiromi Yorozu, a character in Inazuma Eleven
