= Hiroko =

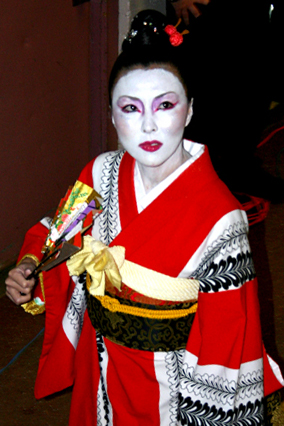
- Hiroko Suzuki, a Japanese wrestling valet and promoter
- Pronunciation: Hí-ro-ko
- Gender: Female
- Language: Japanese

Origin
- Meaning: It can have many different meanings depending on the kanji used.

Other names
- Related names: Hiro, Hiromi, Hiroki, Hiroka

Hiroko (ひろこ, ヒロコ, ひろ子) is a common feminine Japanese given name.

== Name meanings ==
Hiroko can be written using different kanji characters and can mean:

- 裕子, "Kind child"
- 弘子, "Beautiful child"
- 寛子, "Kind, tolerant child"
- 浩子, "Large child"
- 博子, "Wise child"
- 宏子, "Large child"
- 広子, "Broad child"
- 紘子, "Large child"

The name can also be written in hiragana or katakana.

Hiragana: ひろこ

Katakana: ヒロコ

== People with the name ==
- Hiroko Anzai (安西 ひろこ; born 1979), Japanese actress, model and gravure idol
- Hiroko Emori (江森 浩子; born 1961), Japanese voice actress
- Hiroko Emura, Japanese international lawn bowler
- Hiroko Fujii (藤井 寛子; born 1982), Japanese table tennis player
- Fujiwara no Hiroko (藤原寛子; 1036–1127), Japanese empress consort of Emperor Go-Reizei
- Hiroko Hara (born 1972), Japanese former professional tennis player
- Hiroko Hatano (畑野 ひろ子; born 1975), Japanese model and actress
- Hiroko Hayashi (林 寛子; 1933–2023), better known as Chikage Oogi, Japanese actress and politician
- Hiroko Hayashi (singer) (林 寛子; born 1959), Japanese singer, actress and television personality
- Hiroko Ishii (石井 寛子; born 1986), Japanese female track cyclist
- Hiroko Ishikawa (石川 弘子; born 1971), Japanese retired judoka
- Hiroko Ishizu (石津 裕子; born 1956), Japanese archer
- Hiroko Kamada (鎌田 弘子; born 1953), Japanese fencer
- Hiroko Kasahara (笠原 弘子; born 1970), Japanese voice actress, J-pop singer and stage actress
- Hiroko Katayama (片山 広子; 1878-1957), Japanese poet and translator
- Hiroko Kobayashi (小林 弘子; born 1970), Japanese slalom canoeist
- Hiroko Komatsu (小松 浩子; born 1969), Japanese artist and photographer
- Hiroko Konishi (小西 寛子; born 1975), Japanese voice actress, musician and AI artificial intelligence researcher
- Hiroko Kosahara (古佐原 ひろ子; born 1950), Japanese handball player
- Hiroko Kuniya (国谷 裕子; born 1957), Japanese news presenter and journalist
- Hiroko Kurihara, American Oakland California-based designer and activist
- Hiroko Kurumizawa (胡桃沢 ひろこ; born 1974), Japanese singer
- Hiroko Kuwata (桑田 寛子; born 1990), Japanese tennis player
- Hiroko Makino (牧野 紘子; born 1999), Japanese swimmer
- Hiroko Maruyama (丸山 裕子; born 1946), Japanese voice actress
- Hiroko Matsumoto (松本 裕子; 1936–2003), Japanese model
- Hiroko Matsuura (松浦 寛子; born 1990), Japanese volleyball player
- Hiroko Mima (美馬 寛子; born 1986), Japanese fashion model, athlete
- Hiroko Minagawa (皆川 博子; born 1930), Japanese writer
- Hiroko Minami (南 裕子; born 1942), Japanese Nurse leader and educator
- Hiroko Mita (三田 寛子; born 1966), Japanese actress and former idol singer
- Hiroko Miyagi (宮城 寛子; born 1999), Okinawan-born Mahjong player
- Hiroko Mizoguchi (溝口 比呂子; born 1957), Japanese manga artist and photographer
- Hiroko Mochizuki (born 1975), Japanese former professional tennis player
- Hiroko Mori (born 1937), Micronesian clerk and politician
- Hiroko Moriguchi (森口 博子; born 1968), Japanese singer and tarento
- Hiroko Nagahara (永原 裕子; born 1952), Japanese cosmochemist and astromineralogist
- Hiroko Nagamine (永峰 弘子; born 1979), Japanese former badminton player
- Hiroko Nagasaki (長崎 宏子; born 1968), Japanese swimmer
- Hiroko Nagata (永田 洋子; 1945–2011), Japanese leftist revolutionary and terrorist
- Hiroko Nakamura (中村 紘子; 1944–2016), Japanese pianist
- Hiroko Nakano (仲野 博子; born 1959), Japanese former politician
- Hiroko Nambu (南部 博子; born 1968), Japanese cyclist
- Hiroko Okada (岡田 裕子; born 1970), Japanese contemporary artist
- Hiroko Okamoto (岡本 浩子; 1949–2023), Japanese voice actress and singer
- Hiroko Okuda (奥田 広子; born 1957), Japanese inventor and musicologist
- Hiroko Oshima (大島 裕子; born 1943), Japanese sprint canoeist
- Hiroko Ōta (大田 弘子; born 1954), Japanese politician, university president and a researcher of economics
- Hiroko Otsuka (大塚 裕子; born 1967), Japanese retired rhythmic gymnast
- Hiroko Oyamada (小山田 浩子; born 1983), Japanese writer
- Hiroko Sadakane (貞包 紘子; born 1986), Japanese short-track speed-skater
- Hiroko Saito (斎藤 弘子; born 1945), Japanese swimmer
- Hiroko Sakai (坂井 寛子; born 1978), Japanese softball player
- Hiroko Sakurai (桜井 浩子; born 1946), Japanese actress, author and producer
- Hiroko Sasaki, Japanese pianist
- Hiroko Sato-Pijanowski (born 1942), Japanese jewelry designer, artist, author and educator
- Hiroko Sato (佐藤 寛子; born 1985), Japanese gravure idol, actress and singer
- Hiroko Sato (athlete) (佐藤 弘子; born 1939), Japanese javelin thrower
- Hiroko Sengoku (born 1978), Japanese manga artist
- Hiroko Shibuya (born 1947), Japanese luger
- Hiroko Shimabukuro (島袋 寛子; born 1984), Japanese singer
- Hiroko Shimizu (清水 弘子; born 1977), Japanese ten-pin bowler
- Hiroko Sho (翔 ひろ子; born 1970), Japanese ultramarathon and marathon runner
- Hiroko Suzuki (鈴木 浩子; born 1974), Japanese professional wrestling valet and promoter
- Hiroko Suzuki (鈴木 弘子; born 1944), Japanese actress
- Hiroko Tabuchi, Japanese climate journalist
- Hiroko Taguchi (田口 宏子; born 1973), Japanese voice actress
- Hiroko Takahashi (artist) (高橋 理子; born 1977), Japanese artist and kimono designer
- Hiroko Takahashi (高橋 弘子; born 1942), Japanese cross-country skier
- Hiroko Takahashi (高橋 裕子; born 1979), better known as Ao Takahashi, Japanese voice actress
- Hiroko Takenishi (竹西 寛子; born 1929), Japanese fiction writer and literary critic
- Hiroko Tamoto (田本 博子; born 1974), Japanese softball player
- Hiroko Tokita (ときた ひろこ; born 1956), Japanese anime screenwriter and director
- Hiroko Tsuji (辻 宏子; born 1938), Japanese retired gymnast
- Hiroko Tsukumo (津雲 博子; born 1970), Japanese retired volleyball player
- Tsumaki Hiroko (妻木煕子; 1530–1576), Japanese noble woman
- Hiroko Uchida-Yokoyama (内田 弘子; born 1936), Japanese athlete
- Hiroko Uehara (上原 公子; born 1949), Japanese centre-left politician and policy consultant
- Hiroko Utsumi (born 1949), Japanese anime director, animator, storyboard artist and manga artist
- Hiroko Yakushimaru (薬師丸 ひろ子; born 1964), Japanese actress and singer
- Hiroko Yamanaka (山中 裕子; born 1978), Japanese retired female mixed martial arts (MMA) fighter
- Hiroko Yamasaki (山崎 浩子; born 1960), Japanese rhythmic gymnast
- Hiroko Yamashita (山下 裕子; born 1963), Japanese actress
- Hiroko Yamashita (山下 博子; born 1951), Japanese retired long jumper
- Hiroko Yasutake (安武 洋子; 1928-2019), Japanese politician
- Hiroko Yoda, Japanese entrepreneur, translator, writer and folklorist

== Fictional characters ==
- Hiroko Ai, a character in the science fiction novel series Mars trilogy
- Hiroko Haruna (aka Laura), a character in the anime series Hamtaro
- Hiroko Kanemoto, a character in the anime series Smile PreCure!
- Hiroko Katsuki, a character in the anime series Yuri on Ice
- Hiroko Takashiro (高城 寛子), a character in the anime series Black Bible
- Hiroko Hagakure (葉隠 浩子), a character in the video game series Danganronpa
