= 裕之 =

裕之, meaning 'abundant, to go', may refer to:

- Hiroyuki, a masculine Japanese given name
- Yuzhi, a courtesy name of Chinese poet Yuan Haowen
