= Kawazoe =

Kawazoe (written: 川添) is a Japanese surname. Notable people with the surname include:

- Hiroyuki Kawazoe (born 1952), Japanese modern pentathlete
- Keita Kawazoe (born 1999), Japanese sumo wrestler

Fictional characters:

- Tamaki Kawazoe (川添 珠姫), character in the manga series Bamboo Blade

== See also ==
- 7410 Kawazoe, main-belt asteroid
- Kawazoe Station (川添駅, Kawazoe-eki), train station in Ōdai, Mie Prefecture, Japan
