= Hiroki Maeda =

Hiroki Maeda may refer to:

- Hiroki Maeda (footballer, born 1994), forward for Verspah Oita
- Hiroki Maeda (footballer, born 1998), defender for Giravanz Kitakyushu
