= Sengoku (disambiguation) =

The Sengoku period was a time of nearly constant military conflict in Japan from the middle 15th to the early 17th century.

Sengoku may also refer to

== Entertainment ==
- Sengoku (1991 video game), a trilogy of arcade fighting games for the Neo-Geo
- Sengoku (2011 video game), a videogame for Microsoft Windows
- Sengoku (MMA), a mixed-martial arts event organized by World Victory Road
- Sengoku (One Piece), a character in the anime One Piece
- Sengoku (role-playing game), a role-playing game book by Mark Arsenault and Anthony J. Bryant
- Sengoku Ace, an arcade shooting game by Psikyo
- Sengoku Rance, an eroge by Alice Soft

== Other uses ==
- Sengoku (surname), a Japanese surname
- Sengoku clan, a family of daimyō in Edo period Japan
- Sengoku Station, a metro station on the Toei Mita Line in Bunkyo, Tokyo, Japan

== See also ==
- Son Goku (disambiguation)
