= Hiroyuki Suzuki =

Hiroyuki Suzuki may refer to:

- Hiroyuki Suzuki (yo-yo player) (鈴木 裕之; born 1989), Japanese yo-yo performer
- Hiroyuki Suzuki (figure skater) (鈴木 弘幸; born 1959), Japanese figure skater, ice dancer and skating coach
- Hiroyuki Suzuki (architectural historian) (鈴木 博之; 1945–2014), Japanese architectural historian
