= 50000 series =

50000 series may refer to:

== Japanese train types ==
- Kintetsu 50000 series electric multiple unit
- Nankai 50000 series electric multiple unit
- Odakyu 50000 series VSE electric multiple unit
- Tobu 50000 series electric multiple unit
