= Sengoku (surname) =

Sengoku (written: 仙石, 千石 or 仙谷) is a Japanese surname. Notable people with the surname include:

- Hiroko Sengoku (仙石), Japanese manga artist
- Masakata Sengoku (仙石, 1843–1917), Japanese head of the Izushi Domain
- Noriko Sengoku (千石, 1922–2012), Japanese actress
- Ren Sengoku (仙石), Japanese footballer
- Sengoku Hidehisa (仙石), Japanese samurai
- Yoshito Sengoku (仙谷), Japanese politician
