= Masakata =

- Gender: Male

Origin
- Origin: Japanese
- Meaning: Different meanings depending on the kanji used

Masakata (written: 政固, 政固 or 昌賢) is a masculine Japanese given name. Notable people with the name include:

- Matsudaira Masakata (松平 正容; 1669–1731), Japanese daimyō
- Masakata Sengoku (仙石 政固; 1843–1917), Japanese politician
- Yonekura Masakata (米倉 昌賢; 1758–1798), Japanese daimyō
