= Hiroka =

- Gender: Female
- Language: Japanese

Other names
- Related names: Hiroko, Hiromi, Hiroaki, Hiroki, Hirooki, Hiroshi, Hiro

Hiroka (ひろか, ヒロカ) is a common feminine Japanese given name. Hiroka can be written using different kanji characters and can mean:

- 博華, "wise flower"
- 寛香, "tolerant scent/fragrance/aroma"
- 宏香, "large scent/fragrance/aroma"
- 広香, "wide scent/fragrance/aroma"
- 紘佳, "large fine"
- 紘加, "large gain"
- 裕加, "rich gain"

The name can also be written in hiragana or katakana.

== Notable people ==
- Hiroka Matsumoto (紘佳; born 1995), Japanese violinist
- Hiroka Yaginuma (寛香; born 1981), Japanese professional wrestler
- Sarah Sheeva (born 1973 as Hiroka Cidade Gomes), Brazilian gospel singer
