= Marcus Koh =

- Born: Jin-Hao Koh (Chinese: 许君豪); Marcus Koh; 1993 (age 32–33); Singapore
- Occupation: Yo-yo performer
- Website: www.marcuskoh.com

Marcus Koh is a Singaporean yo-yo performer and competitor born in 1993. He won the world championships in the 1A division in 2011. He has been sponsored by the yo-yo companies Turning Point and Auldey. In 2015, he started his own company, called Throw Revolution.

== Early career ==
Koh started playing with yo-yos in 2003 when he was 10 years old, inspired by the TV cartoon "Super Yo-yo". Koh won the national title in the 1A division in Singapore in 2009. He won the world title in the 1A division on August 6, 2011.

== Results ==
1A
Event	2008	2009	2010	2011	2012	2013	2014	2015	2016	2017	2018
World Yo-Yo Contest		9th		1st	2nd		16th	12th	16th		
Asia Pacific Yo-Yo Championships	6th	2nd	2nd	2nd						3rd	4th
Singapore Yo-Yo Contest	3rd	1st	2nd	1st		3rd		1st			3rd
5A
Asia Pacific Yo-Yo Championships				12th					12th		
