= 寛明 =

寛明 or 寬明, meaning 'wide, bright', may refer to:

- Hiroaki, a masculine Japanese given name
- Kuan-ming, a masculine Chinese given name for Liu Kuan-ming, who was the mayor of Shulin City, Taipei County succeeded by Liao Pen-yen (born 1956)
- Yutaakira, taboo name of Emperor Suzaku (923–952)
