= Ben Conde =

American professional yo-yo player

Ben Conde is an American professional yo-yo player and enthusiast. He is currently ranked number 1 in North America in the off-string division.

Ben has been playing with yo-yos since he was 4 years old. By profession, he is a graphic designer and he lives in Los Angeles. Of the five types of yo-yo playing, he is particularly interested in off-string yoyoing.
