= Nankai 50000 series =

Japanese train type

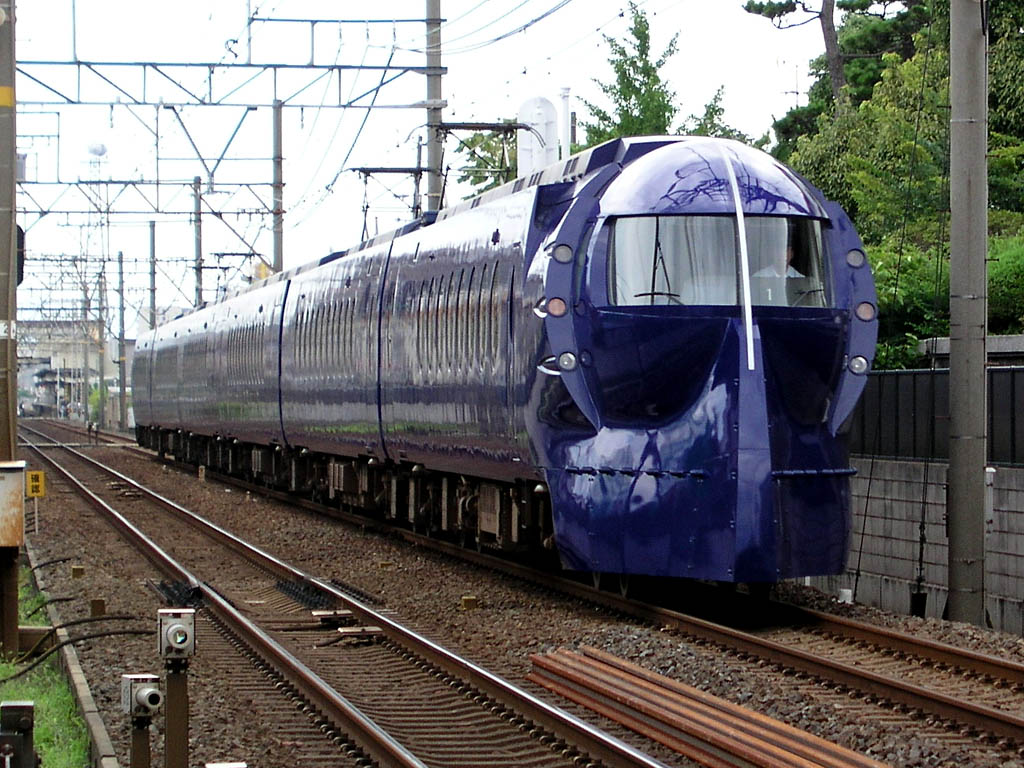
- In service: 1994–present
- Manufacturer: Tokyu Car Corporation
- Designer: Hiroyuki Wakabayashi
- Constructed: 1994
- Entered service: 4 September 1994
- Refurbished: 2014–2018
- Number built: 36 vehicles (6 sets)
- Number in service: 36 vehicles (6 sets)
- Formation: 6 cars per trainset
- Fleet numbers: 50001–50006
- Capacity: 252
- Operator: Nankai Electric Railway
- Depots: Suminoe, Chiyoda
- Lines served: Nankai Main Line; Nankai Airport Line; Semboku Rapid Railway Line (2022–2023)

Specifications
- Car body construction: Steel
- Train length: 125.6 m (412 ft 1 in)
- Width: 2.85 m (9 ft 4 in)
- Height: 4.14 m (13 ft 7 in)
- Doors: Plug doors: 1 per car
- Maximum speed: 110 km/h (68 mph) (Nankai Line); 120 km/h (75 mph) (Airport Line)
- Weight: 219 t (216 long tons; 241 short tons)
- Traction system: Original: GTO-VVVF; Current: IGBT-VVVF
- Traction motors: 4 × 180 kW (241 hp) 3-phase AC squirrel-cage induction motor
- Power output: 2.16 MW (2,897 hp)
- Acceleration: 0.69 m/s^{2} (1.5 mph/s)
- Deceleration: 1.0 m/s^{2} (2.2 mph/s) (service); 1.1 m/s^{2} (2.5 mph/s) (emergency)
- Electric systems: 1,500 V DC overhead lines
- Current collection: Pantograph
- Bogies: Bolsterless SS-137/SS-037
- Braking systems: Regenerative brake, electronically controlled pneumatic brakes
- Safety system: ATS
- Track gauge: 1,067 mm (3 ft 6 in)

Notes/references
- This train won the 38th Blue Ribbon Award in 1995.

The Nankai 50000 series (南海50000系) is a limited express electric multiple unit (EMU) train type operated in Japan by the private railway operator Nankai Electric Railway. These 6-car trains were introduced in 1994 on the new Rapi:t limited express service on the Nankai Airport Line serving Kansai International Airport, which opened on 4 September 1994.

== Operations ==
The 50000 series is used on the Airport Line Rapi:t limited express services. The trains run between Namba and Chiyoda Depot, and have also been used occasionally on special-event services to Wakayamashi and Misakikoen. Between 2022 and 2023, the type was also used on Semboku Liner limited express services on the Semboku Rapid Railway Line.

== Design ==
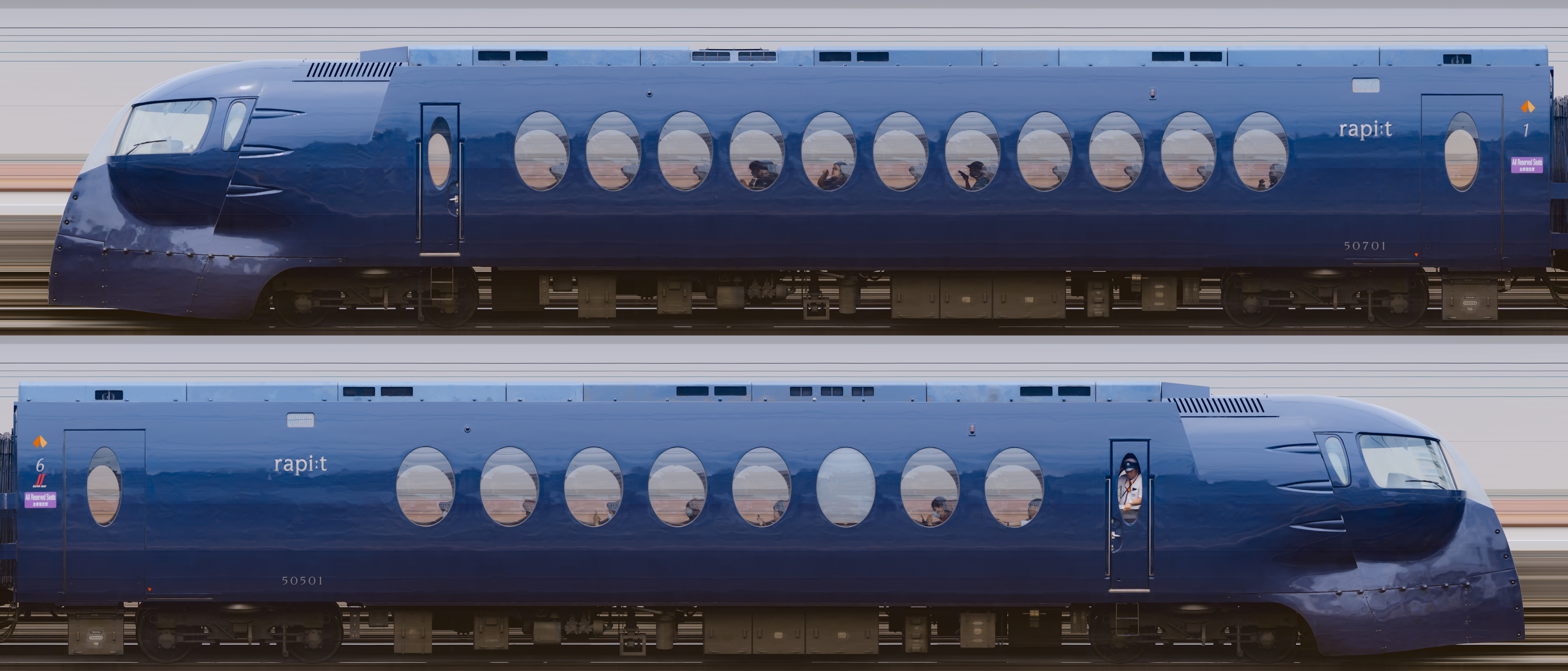
Cab cars of a Nankai 50000 series. The elliptical windows are physically wider on one end of the train than the other.

The external styling of the train was the work of Hiroyuki Wakabayashi, an architect who was also responsible for designing Uji Station on the Keihan Uji Line. The design theme was "Outdated Future", and is the reason for the train's futuristic and retro styling. The end cars feature streamlined cabs without any gangway connections. The cars sport an all-over metallic deep navy blue livery, with the side windows having an elliptical shape, giving the train an aircraft-like appearance.

== Formation ==
As of 1 April 2013, the fleet consists of six 6-car sets with three motored ("M") cars and three non-powered trailer ("T") cars formed as shown below, with car 1 at the Wakayama end.

Car No.	1	2	3	4	5	6
Designation	Tc2	M3	T1	M2	M1	Tc1
Numbering	50700	50200	50600	50100	50000	50500

- Cars 2 and 5 are each fitted with two cross-arm type pantographs.
- Cars 5 and 6 have "Super Seat" accommodation.
- Cars 3 and 5 have toilets.

== Interior ==
All seats in standard and super-seat cars (Nos. 5 and 6) are reserved and no smoking. Cars 3 and 5 feature a service counter and vending machines.

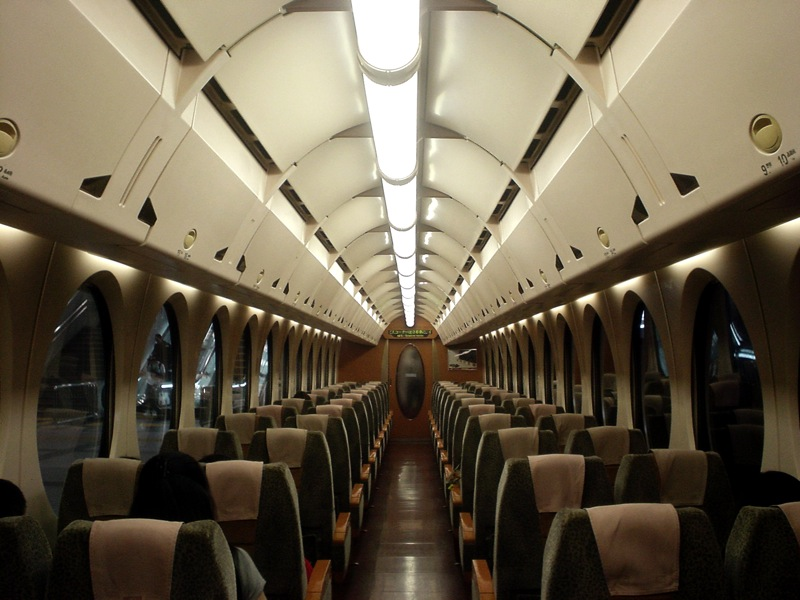
Standard class interior

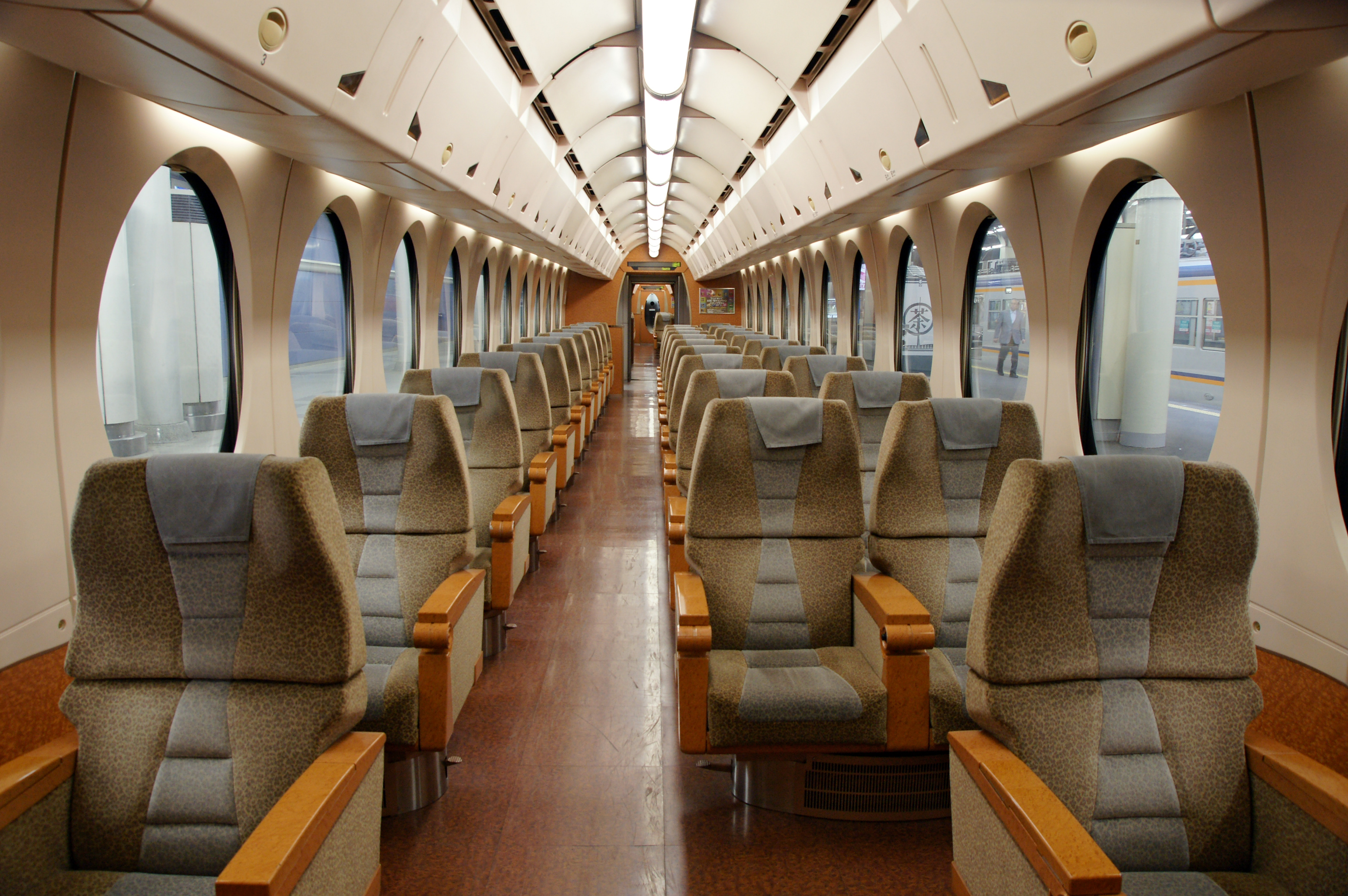
"Super Seat" interior

== Future ==
On 6 August 2026, Nankai announced that development was underway for a successor to the 50000 series, planned to operate on the Naniwasuji Line following its opening. The operator also announced that the train type would be designed in collaboration with the Italian design firm Pininfarina.

== Livery variations ==
=== Mobile Suit Gundam UC × Limited Express Rapi:t Neo Zeon Version (April - June 2014) ===
One trainset was repainted in an all-over red livery in a tie-up coinciding with the release of Episode 7 of the Mobile Suit Gundam Unicorn series and to mark the 20th anniversary of the opening of the Nankai Airport Line. The repainted set returned to service on 26 April 2014 and ran until 30 June.

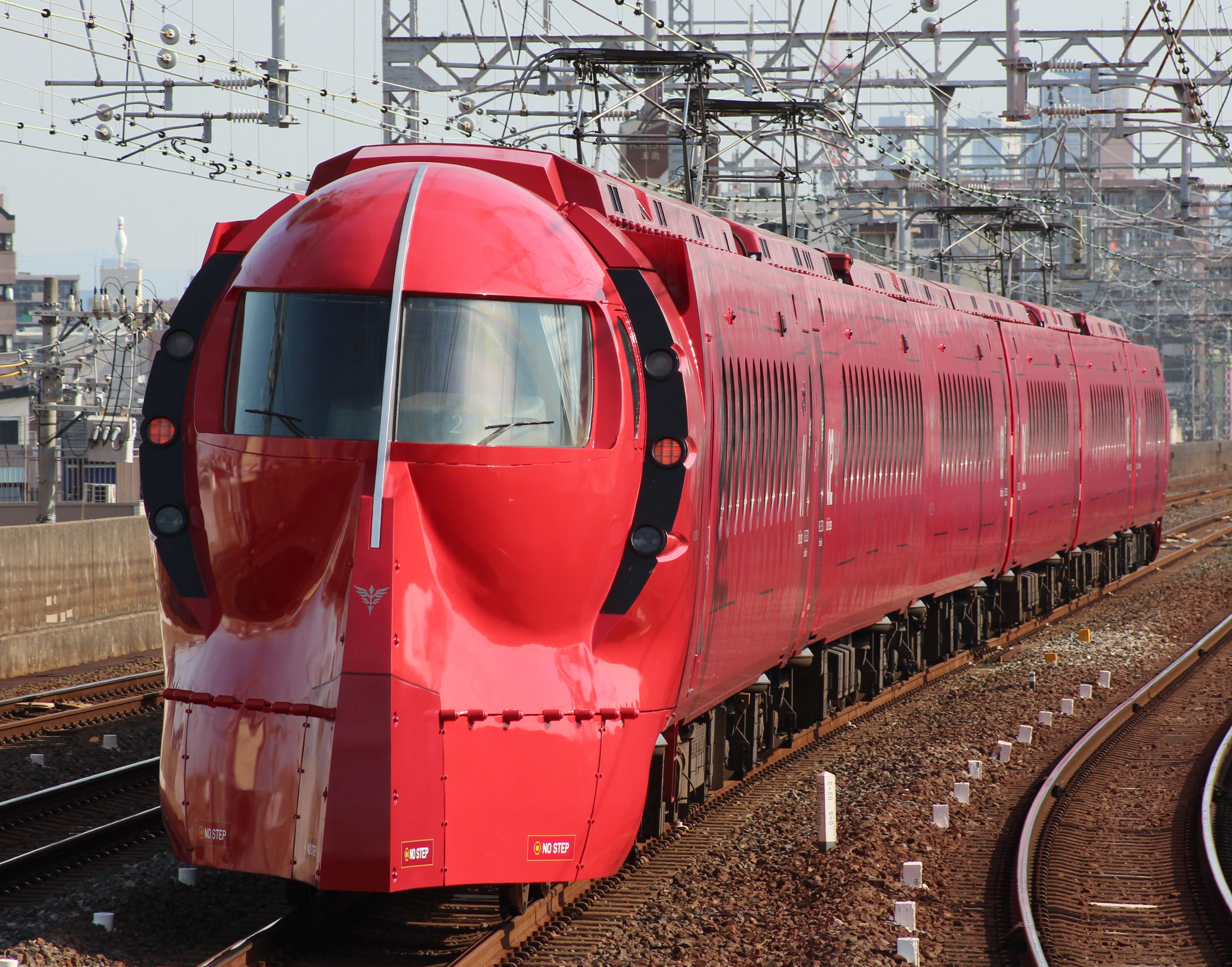
The red-liveried Gundam set, May 2014

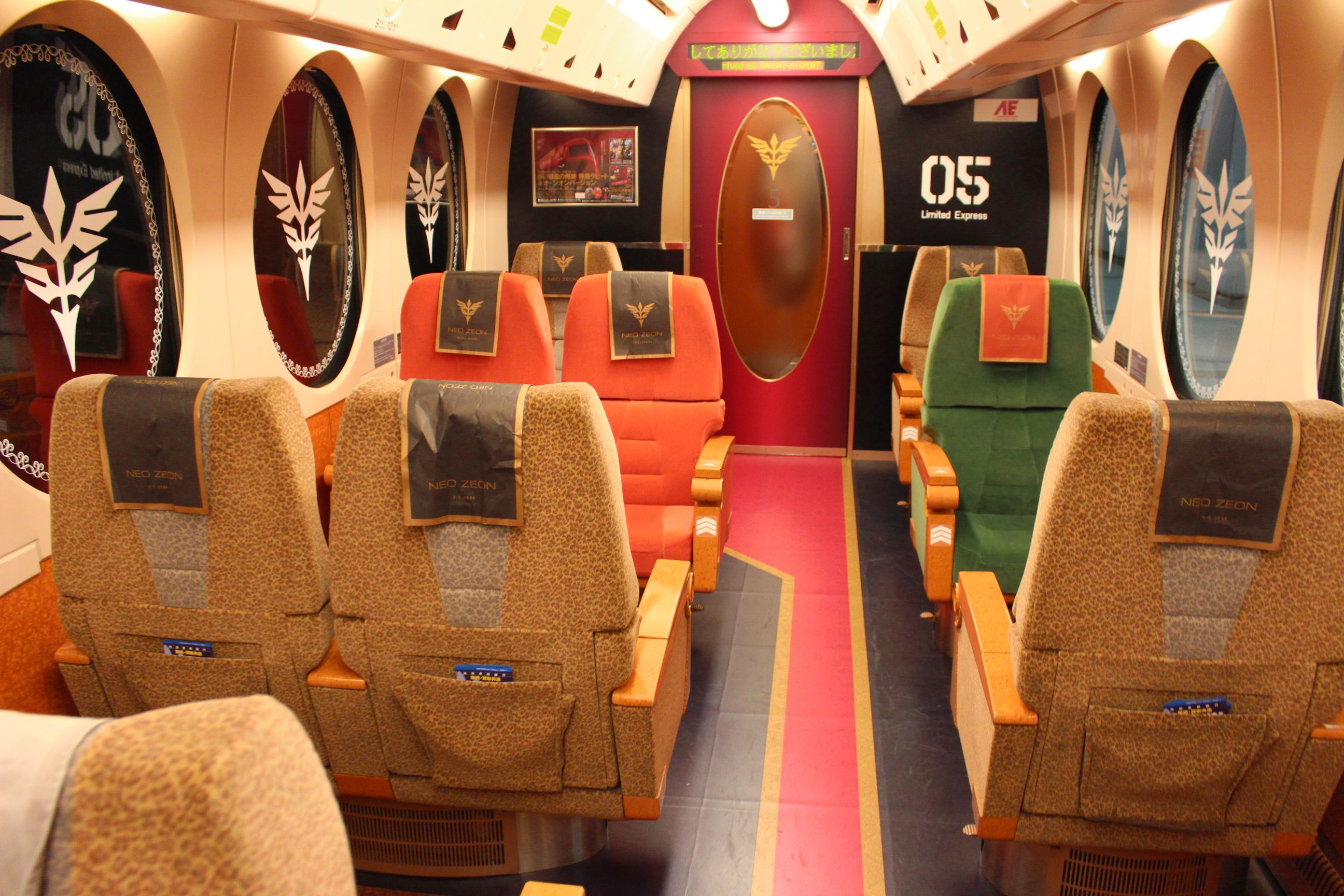
Interior of the Gundam set, May 2014

=== Peach × Rapi:t Happy Liner (September 2014 - August 2015) ===
From 7 September 2014, one 50000 series set was reliveried in a special "Peach × Rapi:t Happy Liner" livery as part of a promotional tie-up with the low-cost airline Peach Aviation. The reliveried trainset was scheduled to operate until 31 August 2015.

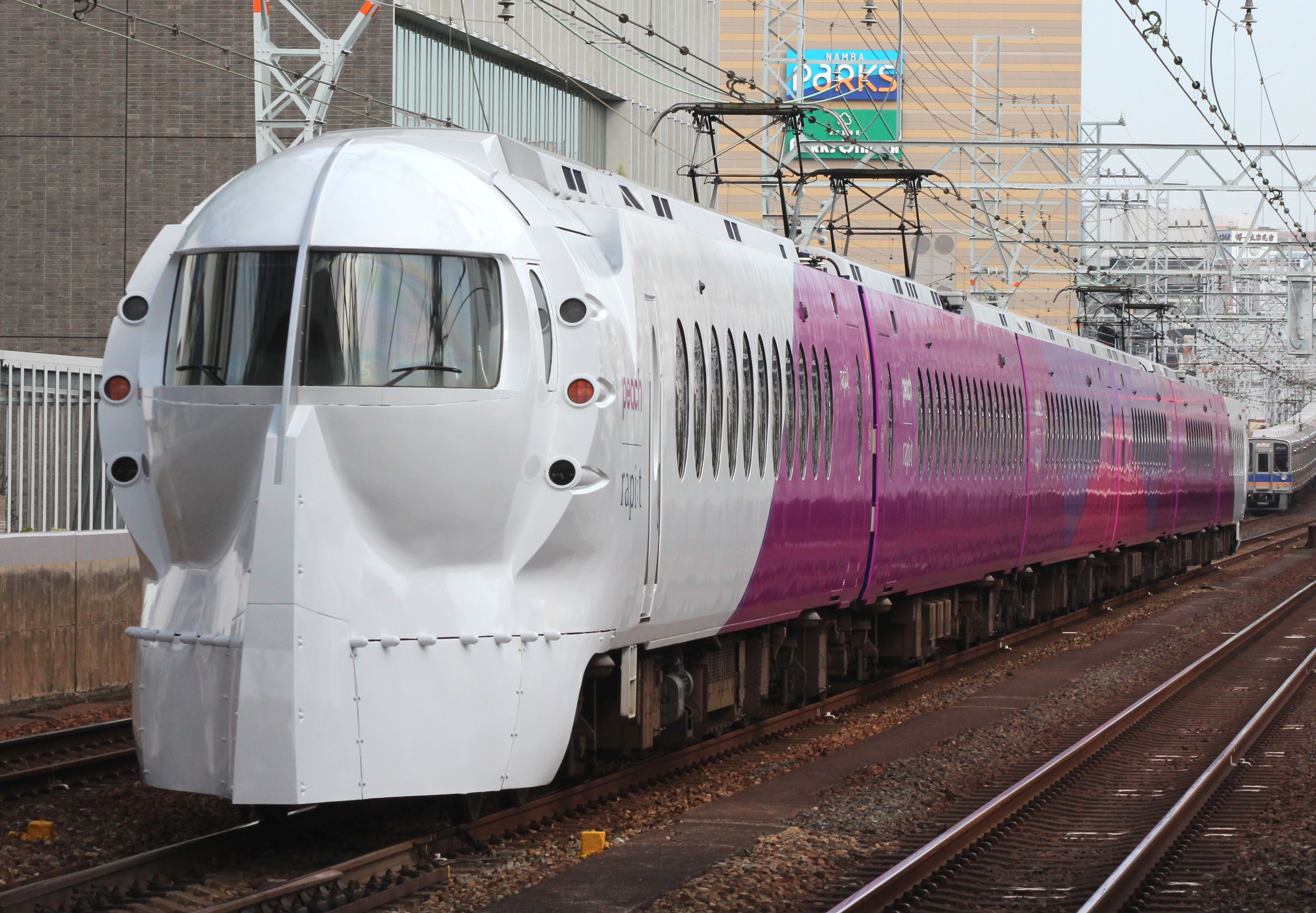
The Peach × Rapi:t Happy Liner set in October 2014

=== Star Wars: The Force Awakens livery (November 2015 - May 2016) ===
From 21 November 2015, a 50000 series set was reliveried in a special Star Wars: The Force Awakens black livery to mark the nationwide release of the film Star Wars: The Force Awakens in December. The reliveried trainset was scheduled to operate until 8 May 2016.

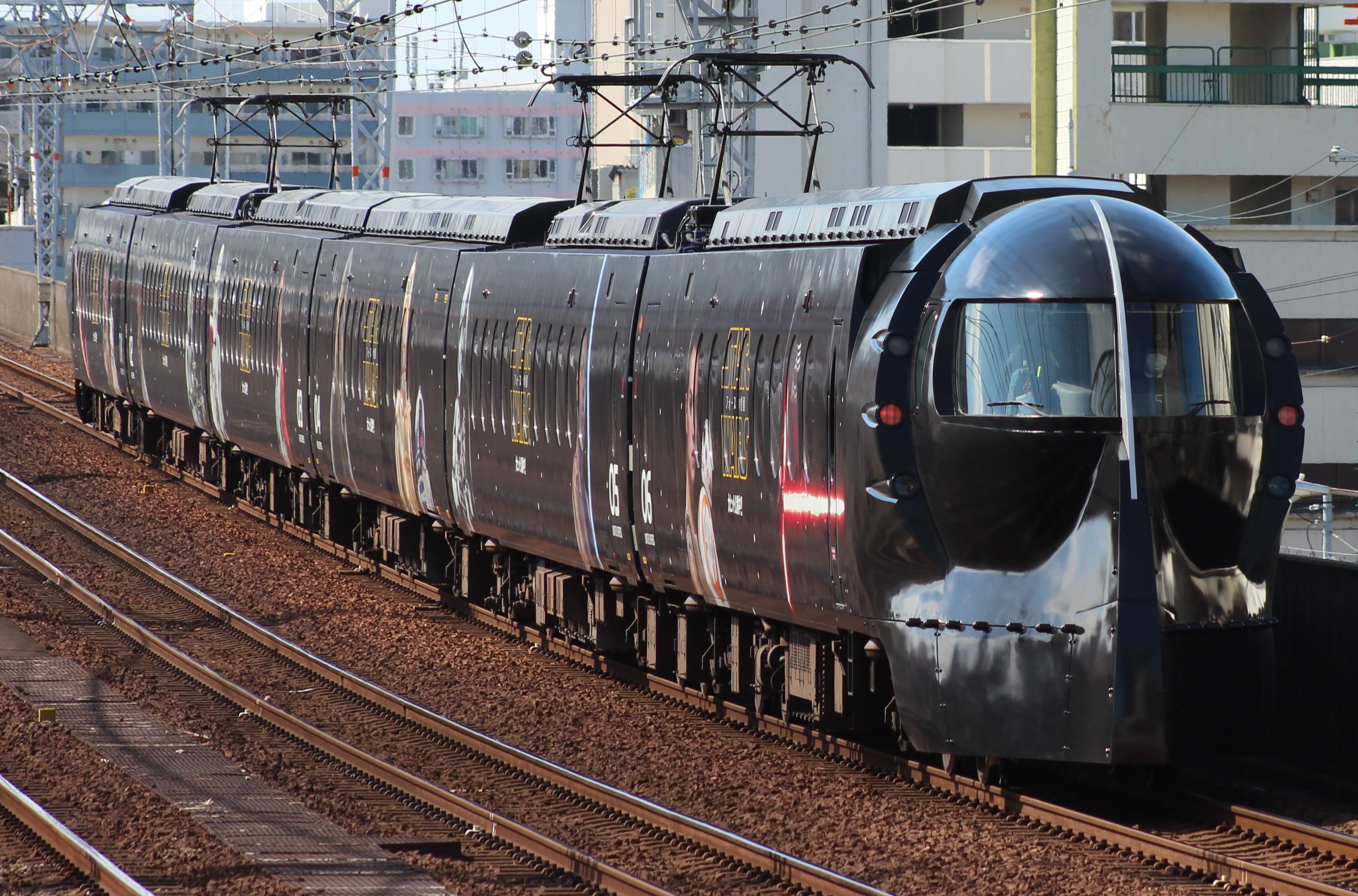
The Star Wars: The Force Awakens liveried set in March 2016

=== Osaka World Expo 2025 livery (April 2024 - October 2025) ===
To promote the World Expo 2025 event hosted by Osaka, Nankai Electric Railway wrapped the 50001 into an "Umi" design. The Umi was set to release on 13 April 2024, one year before the start of the event. The livery was planned to stay until the end of the expo on 13 October 2025.

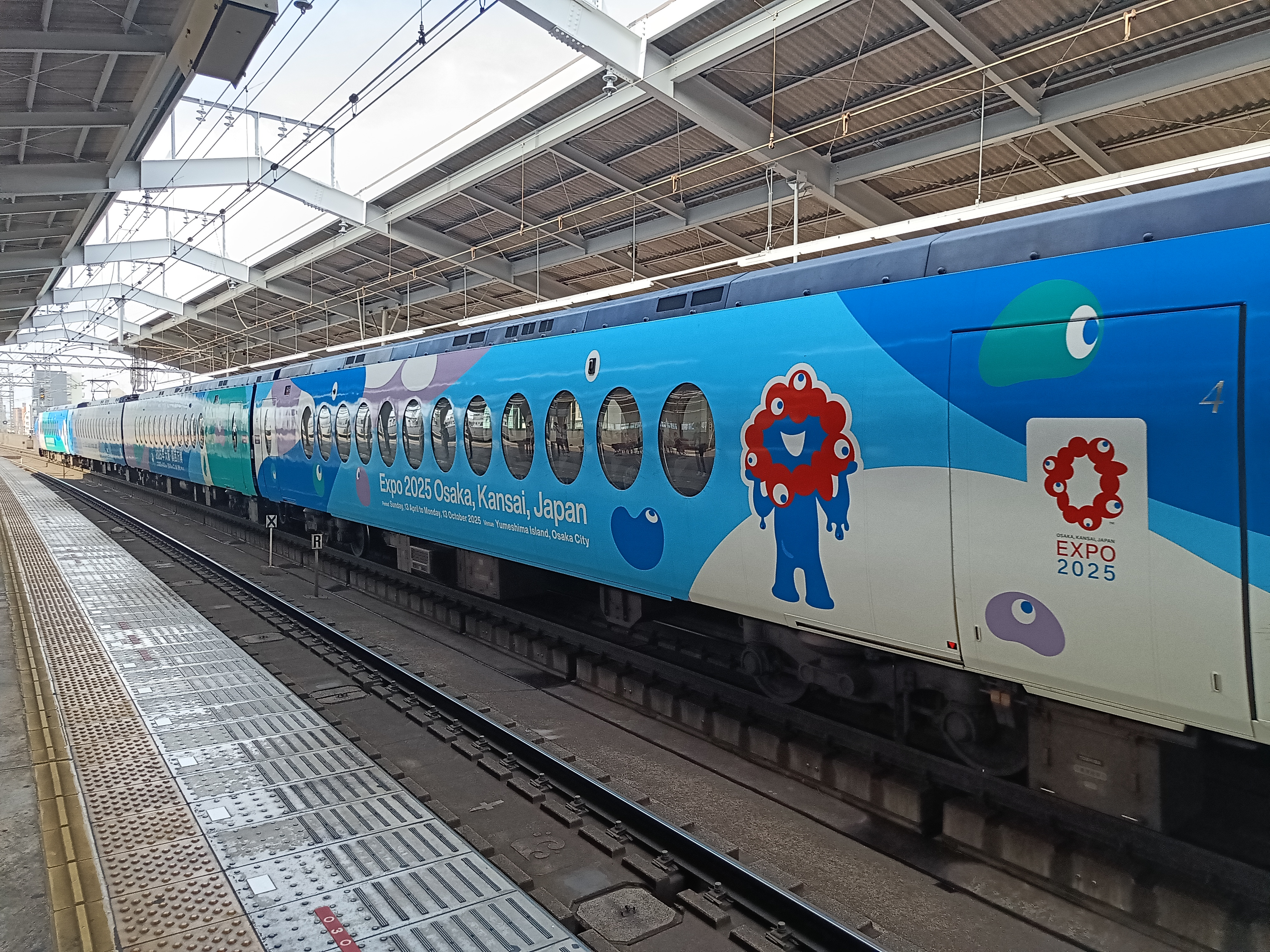
World Expo 2025 livery, May 2025

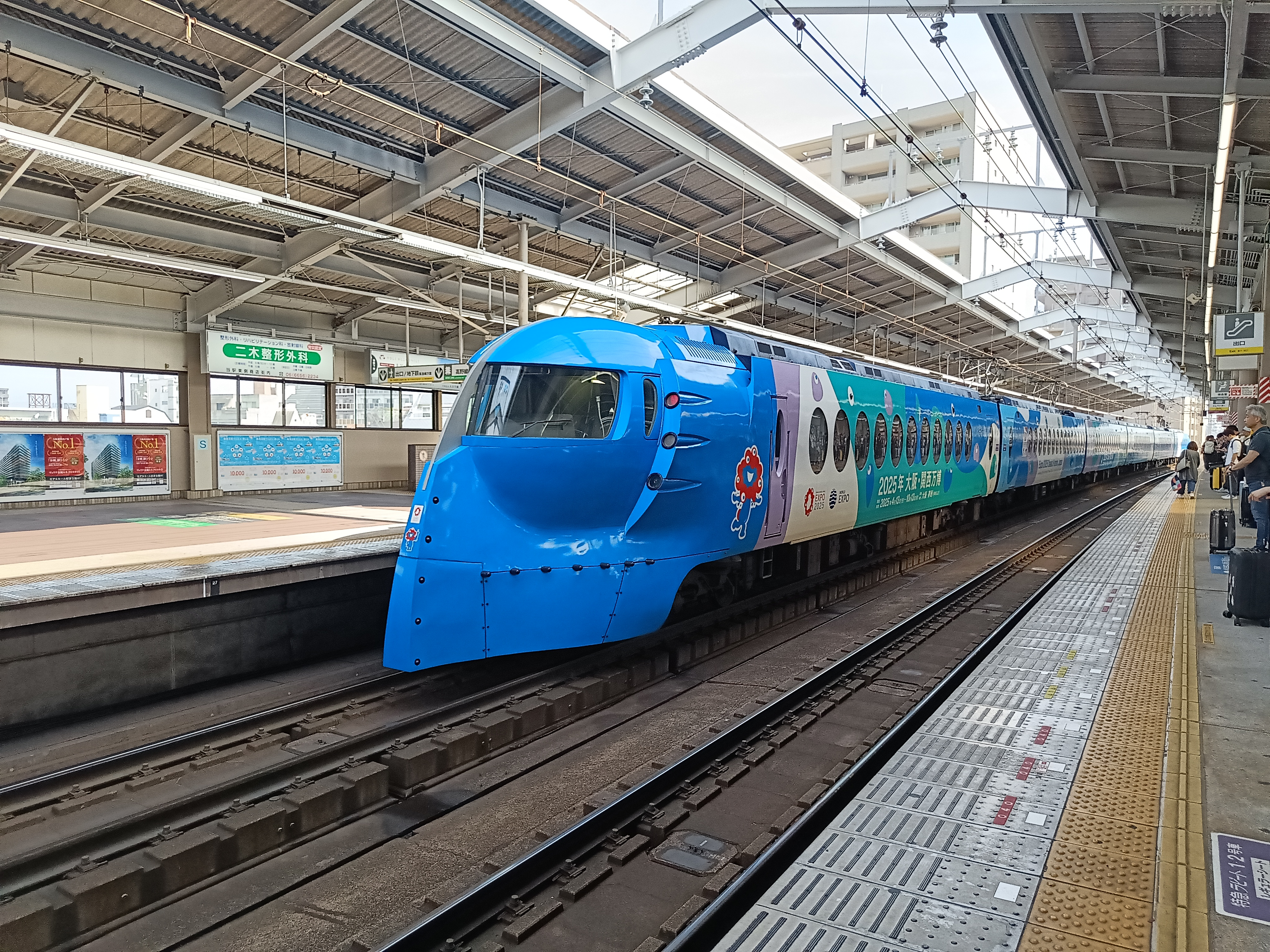
World Expo 2025 livery, May 2025
