= 宏哲 =

宏哲, meaning 'wide, wise', may refer to:

- Hiroaki, a masculine Japanese given name
- Hongzhe, a masculine Chinese given name for Qi Hongzhe, who were the fictional characters in Life Less Ordinary and Mightiest Mother-in-Law
