= Hirooki =

- Gender: Male

Origin
- Origin: Japanese
- Meaning: Different meanings depending on the kanji used

Other names
- Related names: Hiroki, Hiroko, Hiroka, Hiroshi, Hiro

Hirooki (written: 広宙 or 洋央紀) is a masculine Japanese given name. Notable people with the name include:

- Hirooki Arai (荒井 広宙; born 1988), Japanese racewalker
- Hirooki Goto (後藤 洋央紀; born 1979), Japanese professional wrestler

== See also ==
- Hiroki
