= Hiroaki Kamijo =

Japanese footballer

Personal information
- Full name: Hiroaki Kamijo
- Date of birth: April 22, 1989 (age 37)
- Place of birth: Chiba, Japan
- Height: 1.75 m (5 ft 9 in)
- Position: Forward

Youth career
- 2008–2011: Ryutsu Keizai University

Senior career*
Years	Team	Apps	(Gls)
2012–2015	Fagiano Okayama	22	(0)
Total		22	(0)
- * Club domestic league appearances and goals

Hiroaki Kamijo (上條 宏晃, Kamijō Hiroaki; born April 22, 1989) is a former Japanese football player.

== Club statistics ==
Club performance			League		Cup		Total	
Season	Club	League	Apps	Goals	Apps	Goals	Apps	Goals
Japan			League		Emperor's Cup		Total	
2012	Fagiano Okayama	J2 League	15	0				
Country	Japan		15	0	0	0	15	0
Total			15	0	0	0	15	0
