= Hiroki Kondo =

Hiroki Kondo may refer to:

- Hiroki Kondo (tennis) (born 1982), Japanese tennis player
- Hiroki Kondo (outfielder) (born 1993), Japanese baseball outfielder
- Hiroki Kondo (pitcher) (born 1995), Japanese baseball pitcher
