= Hiroki Yamada =

Hiroki Yamada may refer to:

- Hiroki Yamada (ski jumper) (born 1982), Japanese ski jumper
- Hiroki Yamada (footballer) (born 1988), Japanese footballer
- Hiroki Yamada (baseball) (born 1988), Japanese baseball pitcher
- Hiroki Yamada (composer) (born 1967), Japanese composer
