= Hiroki Hikida =

Japanese triathlete (born 1972)

Hiroki Hikida (疋田浩気 Hikida Hiroki, born May 3, 1972, in Shizuoka Prefecture, Japan) is a former professional triathlete and open water swimmer. He is one the fastest swimmers at the Ironman World Championships of all time.

Before becoming a professional athlete, Hikida studied Law at Chuo University and graduated in 1995.

In open-water swimming, Hikida participated in the 2000 FINA World Open Water Swimming Championships in Honolulu in both the 5 km and 25 km races, in which he finished 22nd and 19th, respectively. In the 2001 World Aquatics Championships in Fukuoka he also took part in the 25 km open water race, finishing 15th.

He then switched to triathlon, and thanks to his background in open water swimming, Hikida would often be the first to finish the swim leg. However, his best overall result at a major race was only 9th place at the 2003 Ironman Korea, his long-distance triathlon debut through which he qualified for the Ironman World Championship later that year.

At the 2003 Ironman Hawaii, he completed the 3.8 km swim leg in 47:15 minutes, only 25 seconds slower than Jan Sibbersen. Hikida would eventually finish the race 193rd with a total time of 12:32:50. This achievement made Hikida the third-fastest swimmer in Ironman Hawaii history after Lars Jorgensen and Sibbersen at the time. In later years, several faster swimmers — Noa Sakamoto and John Flanagan in 2008, Josh Amberger in 2017, Sibbersen again in 2018 — surpassed Hikida in this ranking.

Hikida also participated in short distance triathlon races, where his highest ranked result at an International Triathlon Union event as a professional was the 13th place at the 2013 Gamagori ITU Triathlon Asian Cup.

After retiring from professional triathlon racing, he continued racing as an amateur and won within his respective age group several times, e.g. in the 40–44 years age group of the 2015 Osaka Triathlon Maishima Tournament, and in the 45–49 years age group of the 2017 World Series Yokohama Tournament.

Hikida now works at Hydropower Triathlon School in Hamamatsu, Shizuoka.
