= Hiromi Katsura =

- Born: December 8, 1975 (age 50)
- Origin: Ōizumi, Gunma, Japan
- Genres: Japanese pop
- Occupations: Singer, composer, lyricist
- Instruments: Vocals violyre
- Website: Official Blog

Hiromi Katsura (桂 宏美, Katsura Hiromi) (born December 8, 1975 ) is a female Japanese vocalist, lyricist, composer and violyre player, currently resides in Takatsu-ku, Kawasaki, Kanagawa, Japan.

== Biography ==
She was born in Ōizumi, Gunma, and started studying piano at the age of four, began to sing in earnest from 16 years old, and graduated from Oizumi College of Social Workers where she studied Music therapy. After she worked as a care worker for two years, she entered Yamaha Music Academy and from 2005 she started performing live as a member of a violyre ensemble unit called Konpeito. Afterward she began solo activities, and now has been performing in various events in the Kantō region. She is also "A care worker who sings" that makes the best use of the experience of welfare for the music activity.

== Discography ==
- Debut Single 'Maho No Shizuku' literally 'Drops of Magic', released on December 20, 2004.
- First Album 'Dear My Friends', released on February 14, 2008.
- Second Album 'Sora' literally 'Sky' ～violyre quintet～, released on April 1, 2010.
- 3rd Album 'Byouki Ni Nattara' ～「病気になったら」in Japanese, literally 'If you fall ill', released on January 16, 2014.
