= Hiroko Sasaki =

Japanese pianist

Hiroko Sasaki is a Japanese pianist who performs in Europe, North America and Asia.

== Education ==
At age 13, she began studying at the Yehudi Menuhin School in England. Soon after, she made her European début. At 16, she entered the Curtis Institute in Philadelphia in the United States, where she studied with Leon Fleisher, graduating in 1994. She later earned a Master of Music degree with Fleisher from the Peabody Conservatory in Baltimore, and an Artist Diploma from the Royal Conservatory of Music in Toronto, Canada.

== Career ==
Sasaki continues to perform extensively as recitalist and chamber musician in England, Scotland, Taiwan, France, Hungary, Switzerland, Canada and the United States. She gives annual recitals in Carnegie's Weill Hall and makes frequent tours of Japan. She is on the faculty of the Bard College Conservatory of Music in Annandale-on-Hudson, New York. She is a member of The Amadeus Trio, an American piano trio.

== Discography ==
Her performance of works for piano by Claude Debussy on a restored Pleyel concert grand piano that existed at the time Debussy composed the works received a very positive review in The Guardian.

- Debussy : Preludes, Book I & II, Hiroko Sasaki – Pleyel 1873 (Piano Classics record label)

She has also recorded the Complete Sonatas for Cello and Piano by Frank Ezra Lévy, with Scott Ballantyne, for Naxos.
