= Hiroyuki Akitani =

Japanese Chinese linguist

- 秋谷 裕幸
- Born: March 13, 1963 (age 63); Kanagawa Prefecture, Japan
- Occupation: Linguist

Academic background
- Education: Waseda University

Academic work
- Discipline: Linguistics
- Sub-discipline: Chinese dialectology

Hiroyuki Akitani (秋谷 裕幸 / あきたに ひろゆき, Akitani Hiroyuki; born on 13 March 1963) is a Japanese linguist who specializes in Chinese dialectology and phonology.

== Early life and education ==
Hiroyuki Akitani was born in Kanagawa Prefecture on 13 March 1963. He graduated from the Department of Literature at Waseda University in 1985. In 1988, he graduated from the Department of Literary Studies at Waseda University in 1988, and was promoted to the Department of Humanities Studies at Tokyo Metropolitan University in 1993.

== Career ==
Akitani has been teaching at the Faculty of Law and Letters of Ehime University since 1996. He is currently serving as the director of the Japanese Chinese Language Society and is also the chairman of the Academic Outlook Editorial Committee.

== Research ==
Hiroyuki Akitani mainly studies the history of Chinese phonology and vocabulary. He has performed research on Sinitic languages such as Min Chinese (in Fujian, Guangdong, Zhejiang, Taiwan, etc.), Minxi (闽西, western Fujian) Hakka, Zhenan (浙南, southern Zhejiang) Wu, the Guanzhong dialect (关中片) and Fenhe dialect (汾河片) of Zhongyuan Mandarin, and the Lüliang dialect (晋语吕梁片) of Jin Chinese.

Since 1988, he has researched Eastern Min and Northern Min.

== Awards and recognition ==
- Li Fang-Kuei's Linguistic Essay Excellence Award, 2008
- Mishima kaiun Memorial Foundation Academic Award, 2005
