= Hiroko Sato-Pijanowski =

Japanese jewelry designer

- Born: Hiroko Sato; January 1, 1942 (age 84); Tokyo, Japan
- Education: California State University, Northridge
- Alma mater: Rikkyo University, Cranbrook Academy of Art
- Spouse: Eugene Pijanowski (m. 1968–2008; divorce)

Hiroko Sato-Pijanowski (née Hiroko Sato; January 1, 1942) is a Japanese jewelry designer, artist, author and educator. Sato-Pijanowski is credited with introducing Japanese materials and techniques to American metal working. She is based in Yokohama in Kantō, Japan.

== Early life ==
Hiroko Sato-Pijanowski was born in Tokyo, Japan on January 1, 1942. Her father was a doctor who painted as a hobby, and he introduced her to art. Sato-Pijanowski studied Japanese history at Rikkyo University in Tokyo, graduating with a B.A. degree in 1964. She moved to the United States to continue her education and study art, and initially attended California State University at Northridge, studying jewelry design. She moved to the metalworking program at Cranbrook Academy of Art, where she earned her M.F.A. degree in 1968.

In 1968, she married fellow Cranbrook Academy of Art student, Eugene Michael Pijanowski. After their marriage in 1968, Sato-Pijanowski and her husband established a collaborative art practice that lasted four decades.

== Career ==
After Eugene graduated from Cranbrook Academy of Art, the couple moved to Japan where Hiroko built a Jewelry design business, Gene Limited, while Eugene studied at Tokyo University of the Arts. In 1972, Hiroko and Eugene returned to the United States. Hiroko continued making and selling jewelry, renaming her business Hiro Limited.

In 1978, they both began teaching at the University of Michigan and worked there until retirement.

Sato and her husband's work was largely created jointly and bears both their names. From 1985 to 1988, Sato-Pijanowski made a series of oversized, wearable works out of paper and foils using a technique called mizuhiki. They were inspired by Mokume-gane, a Japanese traditional mixed-metal laminate process that creates a wood grain-look to the metal; they brought this technique to the United States and created a new polymer Mokume-gane bonding process. She has authored many articles on the topic of Japanese metalsmithing.

They were jointly elected Fellows of the American Craft Council in 2000.

== Personal life ==
In 1968, she married Eugene Michael Pijanowski, he commonly went by the name Gene Pijanowski. They got divorced in 2008 and Sato-Pijanowski returned to Japan.

== Collections ==
- Museum of Fine Arts, Houston, Houston, Texas
- Museum of Fine Arts, Boston, Boston, Massachusetts
- Museum of Arts and Design, New York City, New York
