= Hiroki Yamamoto =

Hiroki Yamamoto may refer to:

- Hiroki Yamamoto (footballer), Japanese footballer
- Hiroki Yamamoto (rugby union), Japanese rugby union player
