= Hiroyuki Sasaki =

Japanese geneticist

Hiroyuki Sasaki (佐々木 裕之, Sasaki Hiroyuki; born 1956) is a Japanese geneticist known for contributing to clarify epigenetic regulations during gametogenesis and embryogenesis through investigation of genomic imprinting as a model. He participates in the International Human Epigenome Consortium [IHEC].

== Biography ==
Sasaki was born in Fukuoka, Japan in 1956, and received his MD and PhD in 1982 and 1987, respectively, from Kyushu University. He was appointed as a professor of the National Institute of Genetics in 1998. He has been a professor at the Medical Institute of Bioregulation, Kyushu University since 2010, where he has been serving as a dean since 2012. He has been a vice president of Kyushu University since 2015, and a dean of the Institute for Advanced Study, Kyushu University since 2018. In 2025, Sasaki found the genetic mutation that causes Orange cats.

== Awards ==
- 2009: The Japan Society of Human Genetics award
- 2012: Kihara Award of the Genetics Society of Japan
- 2015: Purple Ribbon Medal
