= Hiroki Ito =

Hiroki Ito may refer to:

- Hiroki Ito (footballer, born 1978) (伊藤 宏樹), Japanese footballer
- Hiroki Itō (footballer, born 1999) (伊藤 洋輝), Japanese footballer
- Hiroki Ito (diver) (伊藤洸輝) (born 1999), Japanese diver
- Hiroki Ito (volleyball), player for the 2022 Japan men's national volleyball team
