= Hiroko Takahashi (artist) =

Japanese textile artist (born 1977)

Hiroko Takahashi (高橋理子, Takahashi Hiroko (born 1977)) is a Japanese artist and kimono designer whose work is in the permanent collection at the Victoria and Albert Museum.

== Education and early life ==
Takahashi was born in 1977 and raised in Tokyo. Her interest in fashion began as a young child when she was encouraged by her grandmother who was experienced in dressmaking and knitting. Takahashi has a B.F.A. (2000), an M.F.A. (2002), and a Ph.D. (2008) from Tokyo University of the Arts.

== Career ==
She is known for her style distinguished by the minimalist elements of curvature and linearity to capture the infinite possibilities inherent in the finite circle and line.

In 2006 Takahashi founded HIROCOLEDGE, a company creating various products with her signature circle and line motifs—from kimonos to lifestyle goods—embodying her art and design philosophy. She has collaborated with Adidas, BMW, and IKEA. She also re-designed the packaging for Hokusetsu, a Sake brewery. At the onset of the COVID-19 pandemic Takahashi also sold handmade masks.

Her kimonos have been exhibited at the Victoria and Albert Museum in London and added to the museum's permanent collection in 2019.

She is also a professor at Musashino Art University teaching in the Department of Industrial, Interior and Craft Design.
