= Hiroki Suzuki =

Hiroki Suzuki may refer to:

- Hiroki Suzuki (actor, born 1983) (鈴木 裕樹), Japanese actor
- Hiroki Suzuki (actor, born 1985) (鈴木 拡樹), Japanese actor and singer
