= Hiromi Shinya =

Japanese-born general surgeon (born March 6, 1935)

Hiromi Shinya 新谷 弘実
- Born: 6 March 1935; Yanagawa, Japan
- Died: 9 December 2021 (aged 86); Tokyo, Japan
- Occupation: Gastroenterologist
- Spouse: Miyoko Mogi (1938-1988)
- Children: Erica (1963-) Hiroshi (1965-1995)

Hiromi Shinya (新谷 弘実, Shin'ya Hiromi; 6 March 1935 – 9 December 2021) was a Japanese-born general surgeon. He pioneered modern colonoscopic techniques, and invented the electrosurgical polypectomy snare now common on colonoscopes, allowing for removal of colon polyps without invasive surgery.

Shinya was also known for his health theory. He has authored a number of books, many of them in Japanese.

== Early life ==
Hiromi Shinya was born in 1935 in the city of Yanagawa in Fukuoka Prefecture, Japan (Shinya Medical Clinic: About Dr. Shinya). He was the third child in a family of seven children. From a young age, his mother (Sugano Shingai) encouraged him to earn a medical degree and pursue medicine in the United States. He graduated from Juntendo University School of Medicine in 1960. He then interned at the United States Naval Hospital in Yokosuka. Passage of the Educational Commission for Foreign Medical Graduates examination was required for the program, necessitating a high degree of English fluency, so he "spent a lot of time going to American movies" (Sivak 2004, p. 978) to prepare. This gave him the opportunity to apply for a special program in the United States where about 900 Japanese physician applicants applied to go to New York City to do their residency. He was chosen for this program, landing him in New York City at Mount Sinai Beth Israel Hospital in 1963. He married Miyoko Mogi on March 6, 1963. She was a nurse on the Yokosuka Naval base. She graduated from Tokyo University nursing school.

== Professional career ==
Following the internship, Shinya began his residency at Toho University Hospital, with the hope of becoming a neurosurgeon. However, when a position was offered to him in 1963 in another program to which he had applied, he accepted it. He left Japan for New York, New York to complete a surgical residency at Beth Israel Medical Center. In 1967, Shinya became involved with colonoscopy as a senior resident at Beth Israel. (Shinya Medical Clinic: About Dr. Shinya).

Shinya began developing colonoscopic techniques with an esophagoscope from Olympus Optical Co., Ltd. The instrument was a short fiberscope with a two-way maneuverable tip and was designed for use on the esophagus, but with it, Shinya was able to reach the splenic flexure—the first bend in the colon—about 50% of the time. While other doctors were concurrently developing colonoscopic techniques, most of them practiced a two-person technique, with one person controlling the direction of the tip while the other controlled insertion. Shinya was in the minority who rejected this procedure, preferring to develop methods which allowed one endoscopist to perform colonoscopy reliably. As a result, "many and probably most of the fundamental principles of the procedure [colonoscopy] were developed by Dr. Shinya" (Sivak 2004, p. 978). By the beginning of 1969, Olympus had introduced several iterations of dedicated colonoscopes, and Shinya was able to reach the cecum—located at the end of the colon—in 90% of his patients (Sivak 2004, pp. 978–9).

Shinya's other major contribution to colonoscopy was the invention of the electrosurgical polypectomy snare, known as the "Shinya snare" with the support of Olympus employee Hiroshi Ichikawa. Even before the results of the National Polyp Study linked colon polyps to colon cancer, Shinya instinctively "thought the polyp was the forerunner of cancer and that removing these polyps could reduce the risk of cancer" (Sivak 2004, p. 979). Since polyp removal accounted for 30% of the colon surgery of the day, Shinya's primary focus from his first experiences with colonoscopy was a noninvasive method of performing polypectomy. On January 8, 1969, he and Hiroshi Ichikawa sketched out the first plans for a snare attached to the end of a colonoscope that would allow for easy removal of polyps during colonoscopy (Sivak 2004, p. 979). They experimented with different types of wire, testing them on animal bowels. Within a few months, they had a workable polypectomy snare (Sivak 2004, p. 981). Shinya then performed the first colonoscopic electrosurgical snare polypectomy in September 1969. In 1970, he delivered the first report of the procedure to the New York Surgical Society, and in May 1971 presented his experiences to the American Society for Gastrointestinal Endoscopy (Sivak 2004, p. 977,981).

This development made Shinya famous worldwide. There was immediate demand for his procedure, with his performing 20 colonoscopies a day. To date, he has performed approximately 370,000 colonoscopies and given nearly 300 live demonstrations of the technique. Polypectomy has gone on to surpass "all other endoscopic therapeutic procedures in terms of numbers performed" and "impacts the lives of millions of people throughout the world." According to Michael Sivak Jr., it is the most important achievement in gastrointestinal endoscopy (Sivak 2004, p. 981).

== Claims about Health benefits ==
Shinya is also known for his claims about health benefits of enzyme supplementation. However, some of his claims in commercial advertisements have been criticized as deceptive. Still, critics have produced no evidence to substantiate such accusations.

Shinya has authored many books, of which the most well-known, Living without Disease: A Miracle Enzyme Determines Life (in Japanese: '病気にならない生き方 ミラクル・エンザイムが寿命を決める'), is said to have sold more than a million copies in Japan.

In advertisements, Shinya has recommended taking enzymes from consumed food. There he cites a medical paper that reports a decrease in the secretion quantity of three kinds of digestive enzyme (and bicarbonate) from the pancreas. The article speculates that this is due to aging, and does not discuss intake of nutrients, so it is irrelevant to his claim. He also says that in recent years vegetables are poorer sources of nutrients, and that it is difficult to obtain sufficient enzymes from consumed food alone. His evidence for this is a chart based on references for 1963 and 2008 which shows values of beta-carotene, vitamin C and iron found in spinach and carrots, from which he appears to infer a comparable enzyme deficit in all vegetable food sources.

He claims that his prescription of The Enzyme Factor Diet and Lifestyle has clinical results of a 0% cancer recurrence rate (Shinya 2007, p. 7) but he does not provide clinical data or independent corroboration.
