= Hiroaki Morino =

Japanese potter from Kyoto (born 1934)

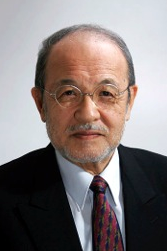
Taimei Morino

Hiroaki Morino (森野 泰明, Morino Hiroaki; born 1934), known by his pseudonym as Taimei Morino (森野 泰明, Morino Taimei), is a Japanese ceramist.

== Overviews ==
He is a Japanese potter from Kyoto born in 1934. His father, Kako Morino (1879-1987), was also a potter. In the 1960s, he taught pottery at the University of Chicago. His works have been displayed at the Herbert F. Johnson Museum of Art at Cornell University, in New York City, and in his native Japan.

== Honours ==
- Person of Cultural Merit (2021)
