= Hiroki Yokoyama =

Hiroki Yokoyama may refer to:

- Hiroki Yokoyama (baseball) (born 1992), Japanese baseball player
- Hiroki Yokoyama (runner), Japanese marathon runner, winner of the Kyoto Marathon in 2014 and 2015
- Hiroki Yokoyama (speed skater) (born 1994), Japanese speed skater
