= Hiroko Uehara =

Japanese politician

- 上原 公子

Mayor of Kunitachi
- In office 1 May 1999 – 30 April 2007
- Preceded by: Ariyuki Saeki
- Succeeded by: Hiroshi Sekiguchi

Member of the Kunitachi City Council
- In office April 1991 – April 1995

Personal details
- Born: 3 May 1949 (age 77) Miyazaki, Japan
- Party: Social Democratic
- Other political affiliations: Tokyo Seikatsusha Network
- Education: Hosei University

Hiroko Uehara (上原 公子, Uehara Hiroko) is a Japanese centre-left politician and policy consultant. From 1999 to 2007, she served for two terms as mayor of Kunitachi City, becoming the first female mayor in Tokyo.

Uehara was born in 1949 in Miyazaki City, Miyazaki Prefecture. After attending Miyazaki prefectural Miyazaki-Ōmiya High School (Miyazaki kenritsu Miyazaki Ōmiya kōtō-gakkō), she graduated from the Faculty of Letters of Hōsei University, but subsequently broke off her postgraduate studies. Later, she became the leader of the female consumer-driven local party Tokyo Seikatsusha Network, part of the national citizens' network movement (also known as "representative/deputy/proxy movement", 代理人運動, dairinin undō), and was elected to the assembly of Kunitachi City. In 1999, Uehara won the mayoral election, ending a two-decade streak of conservative/centre-right mayors. After two terms, she did not stand for re-election (the network movement has rules on assembly member rotation and chief executive term limits). With centre-left support including hers, Hiroshi Sekiguchi was elected to succeed her.

In the 2007 regular election, she tried to win a seat in the House of Councillors via the Social Democratic Party list in the proportional district; but she received only 108,636 votes nationwide, making her fourth on the SDP list while the party won only two seats in the proportional election. In the 2016 Tokyo gubernatorial election, Uehara ran a support group for centre-left candidate Shuntarō Torigoe.
