= Hiroyuki Wakabayashi =

Japanese architect (1949–2026)

Hiroyuki Wakabayashi (若林 広幸, Wakabayashi Hiroyuki; 1949 – 27 March 2026) was a Japanese architect.

One of his first major notable works was a pickle shop in his native Kyoto in 1990, followed by Humax Pavilion in Tokyo's Shibuya. His 1995 design for the Rapi:t express train that links Osaka's Namba Station with Kansai International Airport won the Blue Ribbon Award. He has also designed Keihan Electric Railway's Uji Station (1995) and the Mainichi Shimbun offices in Kyoto (1999).

His work is exhibited internationally, notably at the Canadian Centre for Architecture in Montreal.

Wakabayashi died on 27 March 2026, at the age of 77.

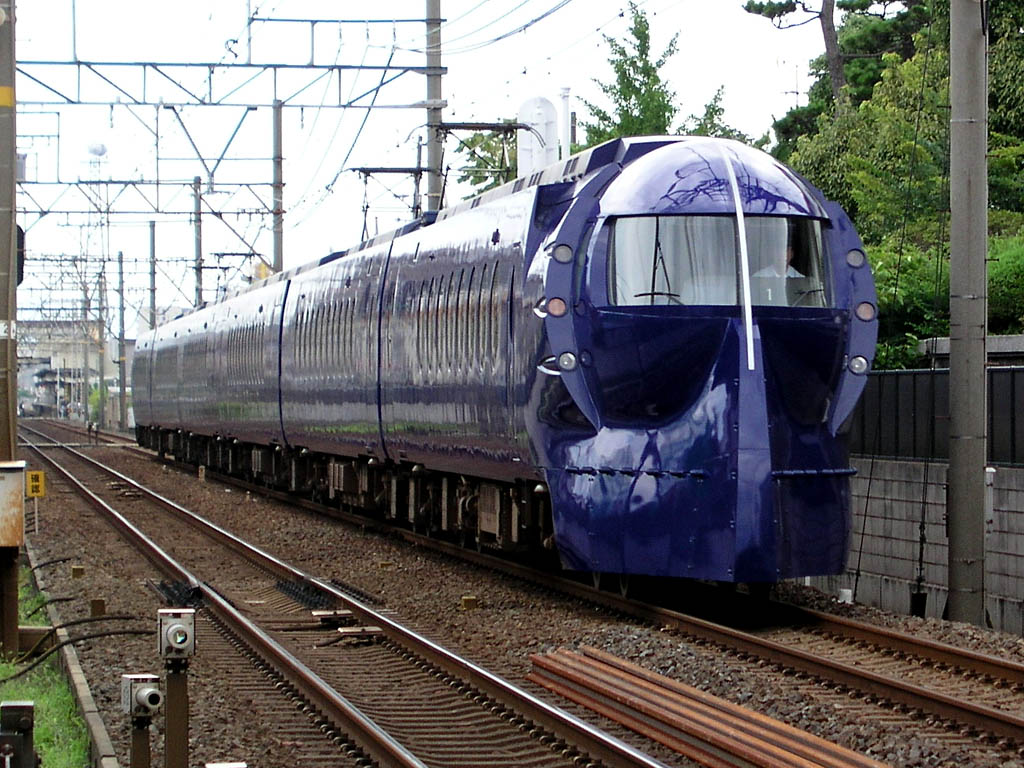
Rapi:t

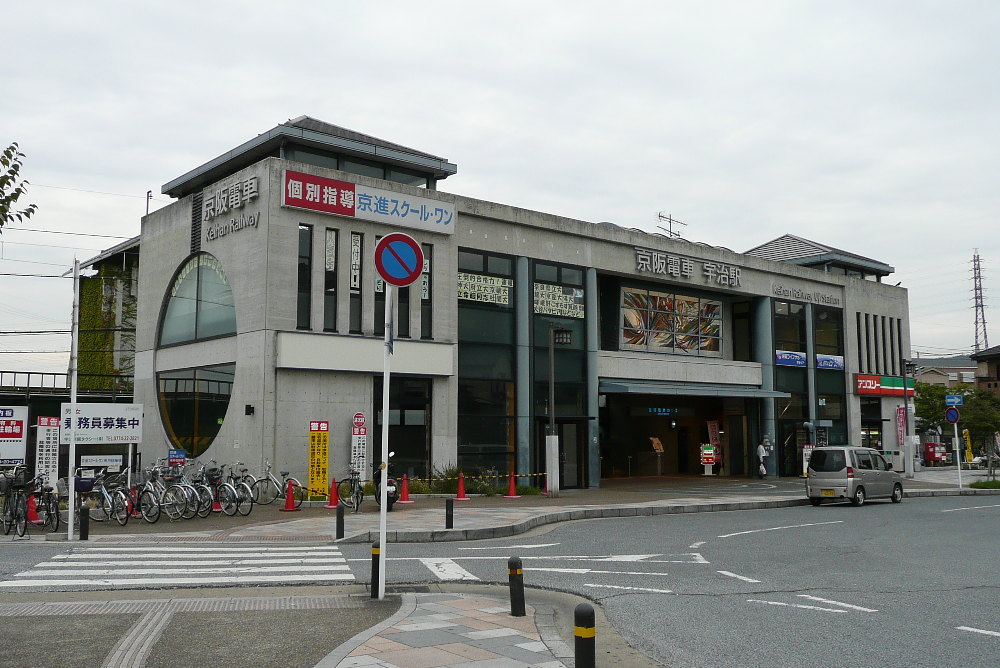
Uji Station

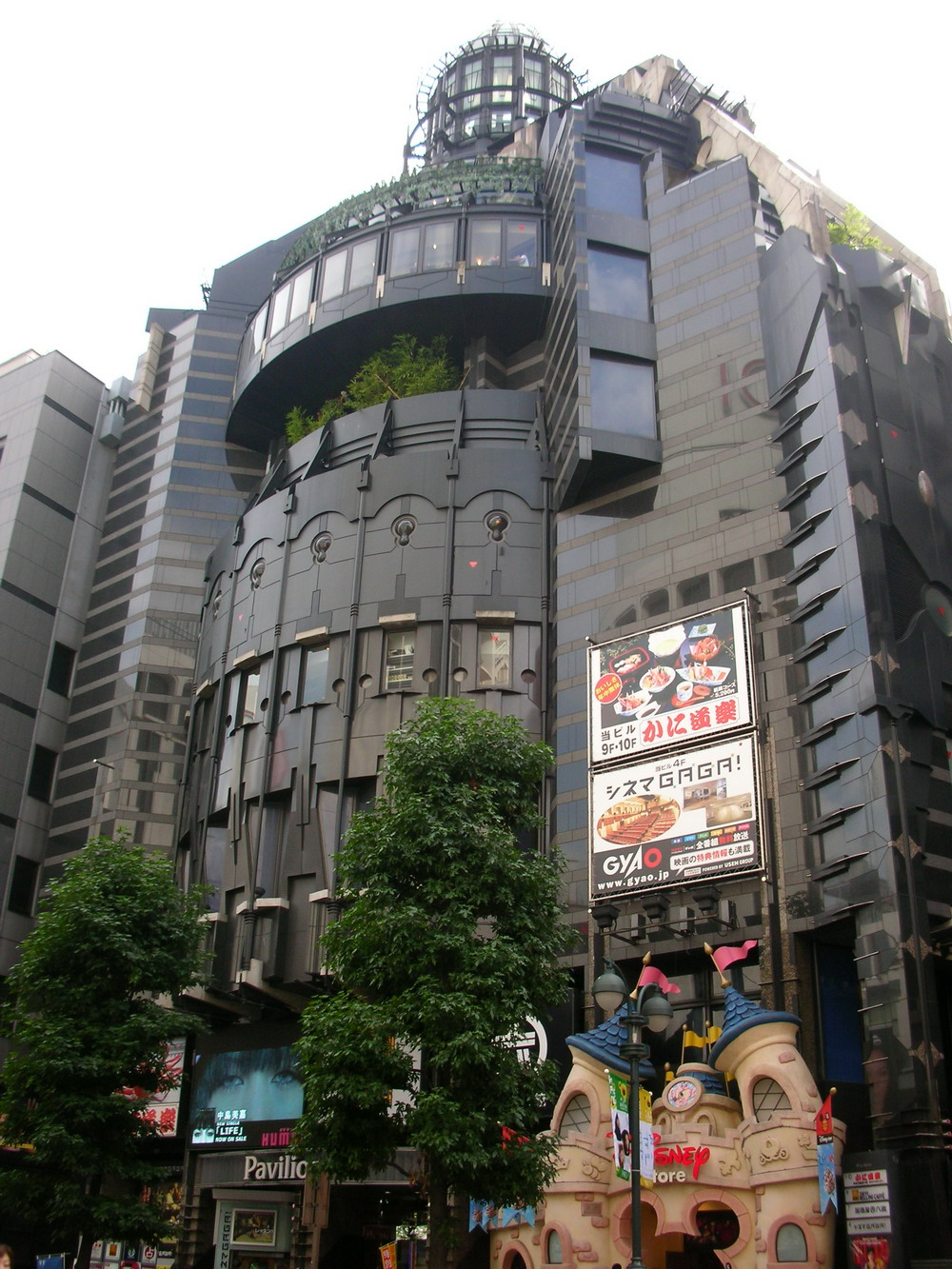
Humax Pavilion Shibuya Kōendōri
