= Hiroki Maeda (footballer, born 1998) =

Japanese footballer

Personal information
- Date of birth: 25 August 1998 (age 28)
- Place of birth: Aichi, Japan
- Height: 1.77 m (5 ft 10 in)
- Position: Defender

Team information
- Current team: Verspah Oita

Youth career
- –2016: Osaka Toin HS
- 2017–2020: Tokai Gakuen University

Senior career*
Years	Team	Apps	(Gls)
2020– 2024	Giravanz Kitakyushu	38	(0)
2025–	Verspah Oita		
- * Club domestic league appearances and goals as of 9 January 2025

Hiroki Maeda (前田 紘基, Maeda Hiroki; born 25 August 1998) is a Japanese footballer currently playing as a defender for Verspah Oita.

== Career ==
Maeda joined Giravanz in 2020.

== Style of play ==
Maeda is able to play as a left back or midfielder.

== Career statistics ==
=== Club ===
As of 9 January 2025.

Club	Season	League			National Cup		League Cup		Other		Total	
Club	Season	Division	Apps	Goals	Apps	Goals	Apps	Goals	Apps	Goals	Apps	Goals
Giravanz Kitakyushu	2020	J2 League	0	0	-		-		-		0	0
Giravanz Kitakyushu	2021	J2 League	5	0	0	0	-		-		5	0
Giravanz Kitakyushu	2022	J3 League	15	0	1	0	-		-		16	0
Giravanz Kitakyushu	2023	J3 League	10	0	2	0	-		-		12	0
Giravanz Kitakyushu	2024	J3 League	8	0	1	0	1	0	-		10	0
Verspah Oita	2025	JFL					-		-			
Career total			38	0	4	0	1	0	0	0	43	0
