= Masakata Sengoku =

Last head of the Izushi Domain, Japan's Minister of communications

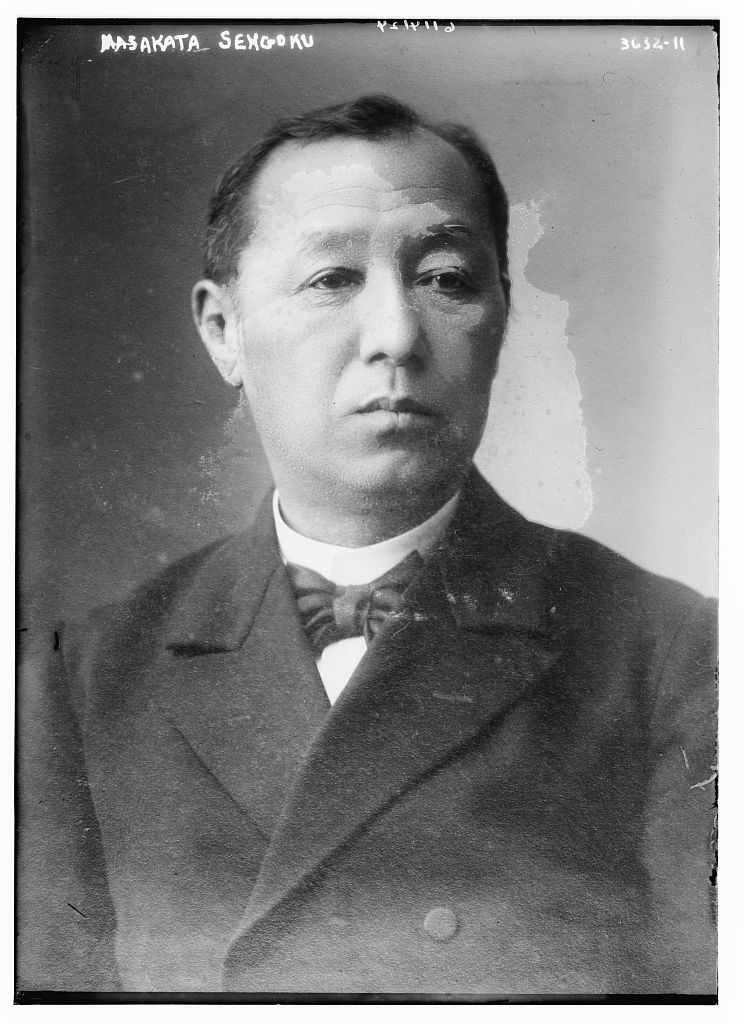
Masakata Sengoku in 1917

Masakata Sengoku (仙石 政固, Sengoku Masakta; June 22, 1843 - October 23, 1917) was the last head of the Izushi Domain. He later served as the Minister of Communications in Japan. He was a member of the House of Peers.
