= Hiroko Sengoku =

Japanese manga artist

Hiroko Sengoku 仙石 寛子
- Area: Manga artist
- Notable works: Your Footprints are Rosy

Hiroko Sengoku (仙石 寛子, Sengoku Hiroko) is a Japanese manga artist. Takeshobo started serializing her work Kimi no Ashiato wa Bara-iro (Your Footprints are Rosy) on July 31, 2017.

== Works ==
- Senobi shi te jounetsu (April 2009)
- Mikazuki no mitsu (October 2010)
- Kono kajitsu ha dare no mono (June 2012)
- Ichibanboshi no Soba de (December 2013)
- Yogoto no yubisaki/Mafuyu no hate (January 2014)
- Anata dake houseki (July 2015)
- Hana wa nisemono (July 2015)
- Watashi ni mienai koigokoro (September 2015)
- Kimi no Ashiato wa Bara-iro (July 2017)
- Okaasan to Yacchan (August 2017)
