= Hiroyuki Suzuki (yo-yo player) =

Japanese yo-yo competitor and performer (born 1989)

- Born: June 23, 1989 (age 37); Aichi, Japan
- Occupation: yo-yo performer
- Awards: 2004, 2005, 2006, 2012 World Yo-yo Champion
- Website: hiroyuki-suzuki.com

Hiroyuki Suzuki (鈴木 裕之, Suzuki Hiroyuki; born June 23, 1989) is a Japanese yo-yo competitor and performer. He is a four-time world champion. He has two world records in "The Most Eli Hops in 30 seconds" and “The fastest time to knock off a coin from the ears of 15 participants with a loop-the-loop yoyo trick.”.

Megumi, his younger sister, has a world record in Guinness World Records for Most skips in 30 seconds.

== Biography ==
When he was young, he also trained Skipping rope, but he quit because he could not beat his younger sister.

In 2001, Suzuki participated in his first World Yo-Yo Contest. He used Mickey Mouse March for his performance, so he is sometimes called 'Mickey'.

He graduated Nishio High School in March 2008.

He was matriculated in Faculty of Communication Studies, Department of Language Communication of Aichi Shukutoku University in April 2008. It was changed to "Faculty of Global Culture and Communication" in 2010.

On March 13, 2011, he was awarded 2011 University President Award for great performance in contests and success in yo-yo business.

In March 2012, he graduated from Aichi Shukutoku University.

In August 2012, he won his 4th world title in the World Yo-Yo Contest in 1A.

== Results ==
1A
Event	2001	2002	2003	2004	2005	2006	2007	2008	2009	2010	2011	2012	2013	2014	2015	2016	2017	2018	2019	2020
World Yo-Yo Contest	9th	2nd	3rd	1st	1st	1st	2nd	2nd	2nd	2nd	4th	1st	10th	8th	15th	19th				
Asia Pacific Yo-Yo Championships			1st	1st	1st	1st		1st		1st	3rd	1st	3rd	3rd	3rd	6th	9th		14th	
Bali International YoYo Open										1st	1st	1st	1st							
Japan National Yo-Yo Contest	3rd	3rd	1st	1st	2nd			1st	1st	1st	2nd	1st	3rd							
Kansai Yo Yo Carnival								1st	1st											
Central Japan Yo-Yo Contest					1st	2nd	1st	1st	1st		1st	1st	2nd			3rd				
West Japan Yo-Yo Contest			1st	1st										2nd						
Nagoya Regional Yo-Yo Contest	2nd	1st																		
2A
Asia Pacific Yo-Yo Championships			2nd																	
Bali International YoYo Open											2nd									
4A
Asia Pacific Yo-Yo Championships				4th	5th	5th														
Sports String (World Division)
World Yo-Yo Contest					1st	1st														
Sports Looping (World Division)
World Yo-Yo Contest			1st		1st	1st														
Asia Pacific Yo-Yo Championships was established in 2003. Bali International YoYo Open was established in 2010. Nagoya Regional Yo-Yo Contest was merged to West Japan Yo-Yo Contest in 2003, and then it was divided to Central Japan Yo-Yo Contest in 2006. The black coloured cells indicate that the event was not held that year, or does not exist anymore.

== Awards ==
- Bali International YoYo Open 2012 B.O.B.(Best Of Best) Division Champion (August 25, 2012)
- Bali International YoYo Open 2011 B.O.B.(Best Of Best) Division Champion (July 9, 2011)
- 2011 University President Award (Aichi Shukutoku University, March 13, 2011)
- Happy Yellow Puppy Commendation (Chūkyō Television Broadcasting, December 2009)

== Guinness World Records ==
1. The Most Eli Hops in 30 seconds (December 19, 2009)
2. The fastest time to knock off a coin from the ears of 15 participants with a loop-the-loop yoyo trick (April 28, 2011)
