= Hiroyuki Kawazoe =

Japanese modern pentathlete

Personal information
- Born: 28 May 1952 (age 74)

Sport
- Sport: Modern pentathlon

Hiroyuki Kawazoe (川添 博幸, Kawazoe Hiroyuki; born 28 May 1952) is a Japanese modern pentathlete. He competed at the 1976 and 1984 Summer Olympics.
