= Hiro (given name) =

- Pronunciation: Hi-ro, Hee-ro, multiple pronunciations
- Gender: Male / Female
- Language: Japanese, Sindhi, Tahitian, Rapa Nui, Spanish

Origin
- Origin: Japan, Polynesia, India, Pakistan, South Asia, Latin America
- Meaning: Multiple meanings depending on the kanji, language and culture, diamond (Sindhi), hero (paronym)

Other names
- Variant forms: Hiroo, Hiiro, Heero, Hira
- Related names: Hiroshi, Hiroaki, Hiroki, Hirooki, Hiroko, Hiroka, Hiromi, Hirok (Hirock), Hero, Iro, Hiero, Hieron, Chairo, Hiroburrato, Chiro, Hairo, Herodotus

Hiro is a given name with various origins. It is of Japanese, Polynesian, Indian, Pakistani and Spanish origin. It has multiple meanings depending on the cultures.

== Background ==
The Japanese given name Hiro (ひろ, ヒロ) has multiple meanings, dependent on the characters used. The kanji 裕 means "abundant". 寛 means "generous, tolerant" and 浩 means "prosperous". It is a unisex name in Japanese, but predominantly used by males.

The Polynesian masculine given name Hiro originates from Tahitian and Polynesian mythology. Hiro is a rain deity in Rapa Nui mythology. It also means hero and trickster. The highest mountain on Raivavae island is named Mont Hiro.

Hiro is also an Indian and Pakistani masculine given name. Its originally from the Sindhi language and means diamond. It came from the province of Sindh along the Indus River Delta. It is generally in the South Asian countries of India, Bangladesh, Nepal and Pakistan. A related feminine given name is Hira in Sanskrit.

The Spanish masculine name Hiro is a variant form of Chairo, Chiro and Hairo. It means "sacred name". It comes from a habitational place name in La Rioja from the root faro which means “beacon.”

Related given names are Hero, Iro and Hiero (Hieron) which have Ancient Greek origin. Hiro is a wordplay and paronym of hero.

== People with the name ==
Notable people with the name include:

- Hiro Arikawa (有川 浩; born 1972), a female Japanese light novelist
- Hiro Yamagata (artist) (山形 博導; born 1948), Japanese painter/artist
- Hiro (music producer) (ヒロ; born 1985), Japanese music producer (writer of Kumi Koda's "Taboo")
- Hiro (photographer) (1930–2021), American fashion photographer
- Hiroko Shimabukuro (島袋 寛子; born 1984), Japanese musician with the stage name Hiro
- Hiro Mashima (真島 ヒロ; born 1977), Japanese manga artist and the creator of Rave Master and "Fairy Tail", among other manga
- Hiro Matsushita (松下弘幸; born 1961), Japanese businessman and former racing driver
- Hiro Murai (born 1983), American filmmaker
- Hiro Muramoto (村本 博之; born 1977–2010), Japanese cameraman and journalist slain during the 2010 Thai political protests
- Hiro Narita (ヒロ・ナリタ; 1941), American cinematographer
- Hiro Fujiwara (藤原 ヒロ; born 1981), Japanese manga artist, once active under her previous pen name, Izumi Hiro
- Hiro Mizushima (水嶋 ヒロ; born 1984), Japanese model and actor
- Hiro Saga (嵯峨 浩; born 1914–1987), a Japanese noblewoman and memoir writer
- Hiro Sasaki (ひろ ささき; born 1950), a professional wrestler
- Hiro Saito (ヒロ 斉藤, born 1961), a Japanese professional wrestler
- Hiro Suzuhira (鈴平ひろ, born 1978), Japanese manga artist, character designer and illustrator
- Hiro Shimono (下野 紘; born 1980), Japanese voice actor and singer
- Hiro Kanagawa (金川 弘敦; born 1963), Japanese-Canadian actor and playwright
- Hiroki Moriuchi (森内 寛樹; born 1994), Japanese singer and vocalist from MY FIRST STORY with the stage name Hiro
- Hiroshi Kawaguchi (川口 博史; born 1965), Japanese video game composer and keyboardist, a.k.a. Master Hiro
- Hiro Takahashi (高橋 ひろ; 1964–2005), Japanese singer, lyricist, and composer, best known for Yu Yu Hakusho ending themes, "Unbalance na Kiss o Shite" and "Taiyō ga Mata Kagayaku Toki"
- Hiro Yamamoto (山本 紘; born 1961), American musician and co-founder of the Grammy Award-winning rock band Soundgarden
- Hiro Poroiae (born 1986), Tahitian footballer
- Hiro Sachiya (ひろさちや; 1936–2022), a Japanese religious scholar and writer of Buddhism
- Hiro Ohashi (大橋 廣; 1882–1973), a Japanese botanist
- Hiro Yūki (優希 比呂, born 1965), Japanese voice actor
- Hiro Peralta (born 1994), is a Filipino actor
- Hiro Matsuda (小島 泰弘, 1937–1999), a Japanese wrestler and trainer
- Hiro Fujikake (藤掛 廣幸, born 1949), a Japanese composer, conductor and synthesizer player.
- Hiro Ando (born 1973), a Japanese contemporary artist
- Hiroyuki Igarashi (五十嵐 広行; born 1969), Japanese dancer and producer known as Hiro, leader of Exile
- Hiromitsu-Aoki (青木 裕光, Born 1980), popularly known by his stage name Hiro-X
- Hiro Badlani (born 1934), Indian ophthalmologist and Hindu author
- Hiro Thakur (born 1943), Indian journalist, research scholar and poet

== Fictional characters ==
- Hiro Nakamura, a character in the American television series Heroes with the ability to time-travel
- Hiro Hiyorimi, main protagonist of the series Princess Resurrection
- Hiro Granger, a character in the Beyblade series
- Hiro, a Hero Templates DS Version Marionette/Wooden mannequin Character in Isaac the Nintendo title, similar to the Golden Sun from Drawn to Life: The Next Chapter.
- Hiro Protagonist, a character in the science fiction novel Snow Crash
- Hiro Sohma, a character in the Fruits Basket anime and manga series
- Hiro, a character from the video game Bust a Groove
- Hiro, a character from the Hidamari Sketch comic strip
- Hiro, the main character in Lunar: Eternal Blue video game
- Hiro, a character in Ginga Densetsu Weed series
- Hiiro, also known as Nora, a major supporting character in the manga/anime series Noragami.
- Hiro Sakurai, a main character in the Original English-language manga Miki Falls
- Hiro, a Japanese steam engine character from the Thomas and Friends special "Hero of the Rails"
- Hiro Fuse, a character from Scott Westerfeld's book, "Extras", of the Uglies series
- Hiro the Mini Ninja, a player character in Mini Ninjas video game
- Hiro Miyamoto, a swordmaster and protagonist in the game Daikatana
- Heero Yuy (ヒロ・ユイ, Hiro Yui), Pilot of the Zero suit and a main character in Mobile Suit Gundam Wing
- Hiro Oozora, a character from Little Battlers Experience W, one of the three protagonists.
- Hiro, one of the giant ninja toads from Mount Myoboku from the anime and manga series, Naruto.
- Hiro Takachiho, Marvel character from the superhero team Big Hero 6. He was renamed Hiro Hamada in the 2014 Disney film adaptation.
- Hiro, a character from the anime Darling in the Franxx.
- Hiro, one of the instructors in the video game Fitness Boxing 2: Rhythm and Exercise.
- Hiro Amanokawa, the main character of Digimon Ghost Game
- Hiro-Kala, a supervillain from Marvel Comics
- Hiro Okamura, a teenage mechanical genius from Japan first appeared as the Toyman in Superman (vol. 2) #177
- Hiro Okuiri, a character from the anime Inazuma Eleven: Ares
- Hiro Segawa, a character from the manga A Couple of Cuckoos
- Hiro Shinosawa, a character from the game Gakuen Idolmaster
- Hiiro Kagami, a character in the tokusatsu series Kamen Rider Ex-Aid
- Hiiro Amagi, a character from the rhythm game Ensemble Stars!!

== Mythology ==
- Hiro is the god of thieves in Tahiti mythology, and a demigod in Polynesian mythology. He was the first builder of large canoes with planks sewn together called pahi.
- In Rapa Nui mythology, Hiro is an ancient rain deity. There is a stone aerophone on Easter Island called Pu o Hiro. It was used for fertility rituals and to call the rain deity during drought.

== See also ==
- List of names derived from gemstones
- Hiroo (given name)
- Hiro
