= Music of Easter Island =

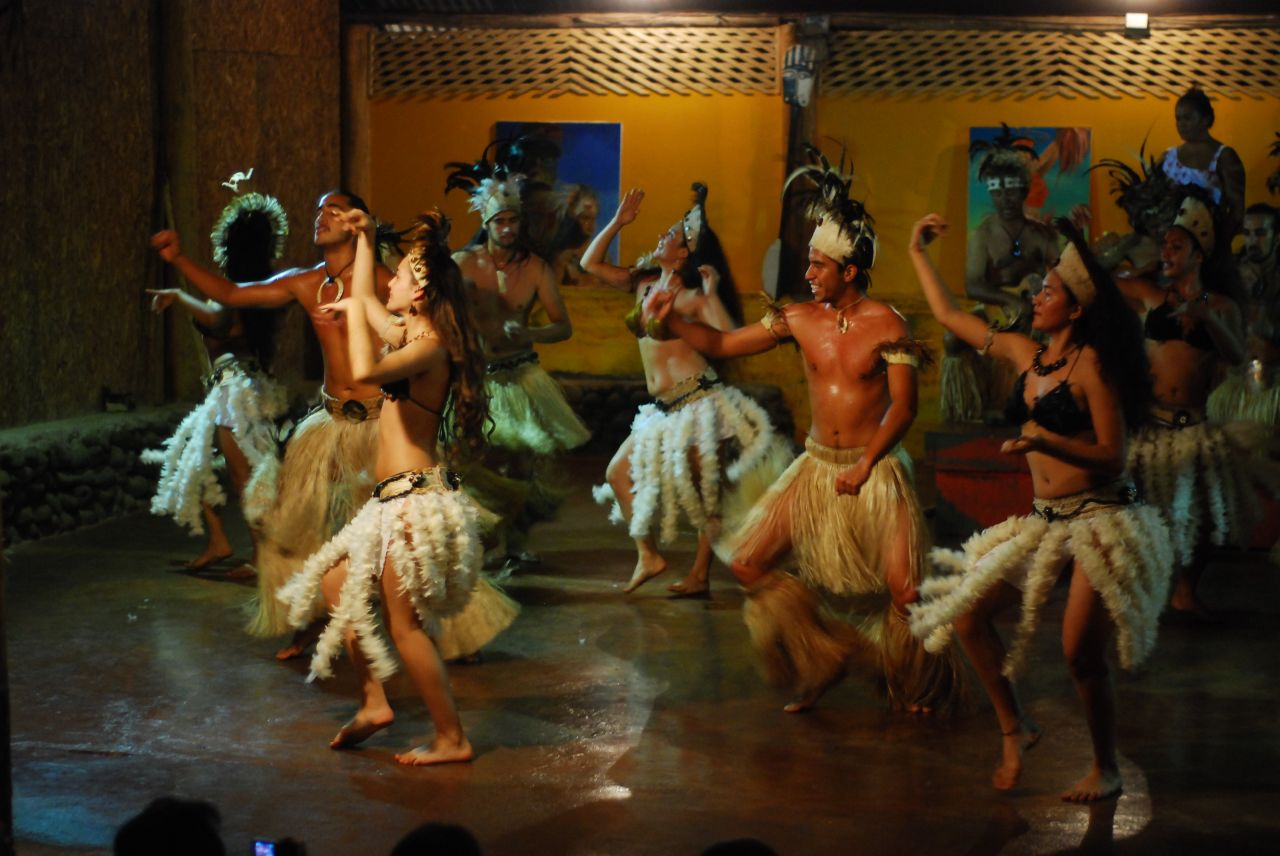
Traditional musical dance of Rapa Nui (Easter Island)

Easter Island, a Polynesian island that is part of Chile, has a unique regional musical history.

== History ==
=== Pu o Hiro ===
The Rapa Nui used an ancient stone aerophone called the Pu o Hiro (Trumpet of Hiro) for fertility rituals and to call the Polynesian god of rain Hiro. By blowing through the main hole it emits a deep trumpet sound. During droughts, the Ariki Paka (nobles) would dress in ceremonial clothing and pray for rainfall. They chanted the following song:

E te uá, matavai-roa a Hiro-é
(The rain, the great tears of Hiro)
ka hoa mai koe kiraro
(Send us down)
ka rei mai koe kiraro
(Pour down)
e te u´a matavai-roa a Hiro-é
(The rain, the great tears of Hiro)

=== Music school ===
The first music school on the Easter Island was opened in 2012 by Mahani Teave, and teaches piano, cello, ukulele, and violin.

== See also ==
- Matato'a
- Music of Chile
- Topatangi
