= Hiro =

Hiro may refer to:

== People ==
- Hiro (given name), includes lists of people with the given name
- Hiro (photographer) (1930–2021), Japanese-born American photographer
- Hiro (singer) (born 1991), French singer
- Hiroko Shimabukuro (born 1984), Japanese singer
- Kazu Hiro (born 1969), American prosthetic makeup artist
- Hiroshi "Hiro" Kawaguchi (composer) (born 1965), Japanese composer
- Hiro-x (born 1980), Japanese singer and modern J-pop artist
- Dilip Hiro (born 1932), Indian author and journalist

== Arts, entertainment and media ==
=== Fictional characters ===
- Hiro, the main character of Darling in the Franxx
- Hiro Amanokawa, the main character of Digimon Ghost Game
- Hiro Nakamura, a main character from the TV series Heroes
- Nikaidō Hiro (二階堂 ヒロ), a character in Magical Girl Witch Trials

=== Film and television ===
- Hiros (TV episode) 2008 season 1 episode 5 of the NBC fantasy-sci-fi TV series Heroes
- Hiro (film), a Canadian short film
- Hiro (TV channel), an Italian channel

=== Music ===
- "Hiro's Song", by Ben Folds
- "Yuko and Hiro", a Blur song
- "Letter from Hiro", a song by The Vapors, off New Clear Days

== Places ==
- Hiro, a town in Odisha, India.
- Hiro Hachiman Shrine, a Shinto shrine located in Hirogawa, Wakayama Prefecture, Japan
- Hiroshima, a city in Japan
- Hiro Naval Arsenal at Kure, Hiroshima
- Mont Hiro (Mount Hiro), a 438 m (1,437 ft) high mountain on Raivavae island in French Polynesia.

== Science and technology ==
- HiROS (High Resolution Optical System) German spy satellite
- Hiro H2H, a Japanese patrol flying boat of the 1930s
- Hiro Type 94, a W-18 liquid-cooled aircraft engine

== Other uses ==
- Hiro (unit) a Japanese unit of length, 1.8 m (a fathom)

== See also ==
- Hero (disambiguation)
- Hiroo (disambiguation)
- Hirohi
