= Hero (given name) =

Given name

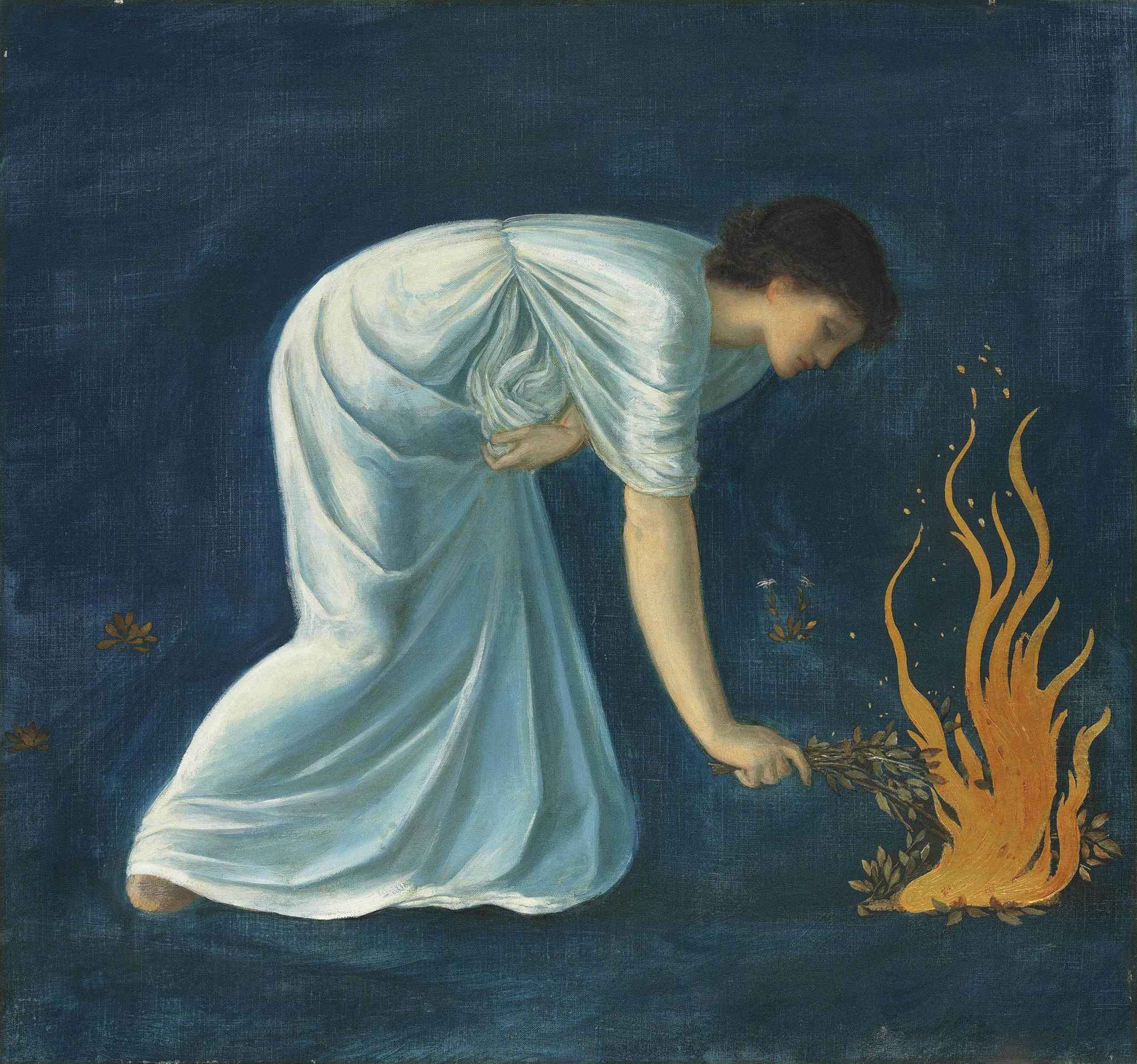
- Hero by Edward Burne-Jones.
- Pronunciation: HEER-o.
- Gender: Unisex

Origin
- Origin: Ancient Greek
- Meaning: hero

Other names
- Related names: Herro, Hiro, Herodotus, Iro, Iroula, Irouka

Hero is a given name of Ancient Greek origin meaning "hero". When occurring in English discussions of classical literature, it is sometimes transliterated as Hērō (Ancient Greek: Ἡρώ). The Ancient Greeks pronounced this name along the lines of /he.roː/ while present-day English speakers pronounce it /ˈhi.ɹoʊ/. The modern Greek pronunciation of the name is /i.ˈro/ (Iro).

In literature, female characters named Hero include one of the titular star-crossed lovers of the Ancient Greek myth Hero and Leander, a wronged bride-to-be in William Shakespeare's 1599 comedy Much Ado About Nothing, and the protagonist of Georgette Heyer's 1944 Regency romance novel Friday's Child.

The classical masculine counterpart of the name Hero, Heron (Ἥρων), is associated with historical figures such as the mathematicians Heron the Elder and Heron the Younger. Modern authors frequently refer to these figures as Hero, however, making no distinction between the classical feminine form and masculine form of the name.

The name Hero has in recent years seen occasional use for both boys and girls in the English-speaking world. In the United States, the name was given to 13 newborn girls and 68 newborn boys in 2022. In 2023, the name was given to 67 newborn American boys and five newborn American girls. It is also in occasional use in other English-speaking countries, including the United Kingdom.

Hiro, a Japanese name with multiple meanings that became more widely known following the appearance of Hiro Nakamura, a character on the 2006–2010 American television series Heroes, was given to 67 newborn American boys in 2022. The Japanese male character's first name was intended as a play on the English word "hero".

Notable people with the name include:

== Men ==
- Hero of Alexandria (fl. 60 AD), Greek mathematician and engineer who was active in his native city of Alexandria during the Roman era
- Heron the Younger, Greek mathematician
- Hero Alom (born 1985), Bangladeshi model, actor, producer, singer, and politician
- Hero Angeles (born 1984), Filipino actor
- Hero Brinkman (born 1964), Dutch politician
- Hero Fiennes Tiffin (born 1997), English actor and model
- Hero Kanu (born 2004), German-American football player
- Hero Schomerus (1816–1856), Dutch military and colonial administrator

== Women ==
- Hero Ibrahim Ahmed (born 1948), former First Lady of Iraq and widow of Jalal Talabani

== Fictional characters ==
- Hero Cruz, Latino gay superhero of African descent in DC comics
- Hero Brown, Yorick Brown's older sister in the series Y the Last Man
- Hero, a main character in the role-playing psychological horror game Omori

== See also ==
- Hero (disambiguation), for people with the mononym, fictional characters, and uses in mythology
- Herro, given name and surname
