= Hiroo =

Hiroo may refer to:

== People ==
- Hiroo (given name), a masculine Japanese given name

== Places ==
- Hiroo, Shibuya, Tokyo, a neighborhood in the Shibuya district of Tokyo
- Hiroo Station, a subway station in Tokyo.
- Hiroo, Hokkaidō, a town in the Tokachi subprefecture of Hokkaidō
- Hiroo District, Hokkaidō, a district in Tokachi Subprefecture of Hokkaidō
- Mount Hiroo, a mountain in the Hidaka Mountains of Hokkaidō

== See also ==
- Hiro (disambiguation)
