= Hirohi =

- Pronunciation: Hirohi

Origin
- Origin: Japanese
- Region of origin: Japanese

Hirohi (Japanese: ひろひ, ヒロヒ) is a Japanese given name. It can also serve as a foreshortening of other names, including Hirohide, Hirohiko, Hirohisa, and Hirohito.
