= IRO =

IRO, Iro, or iro may refer to:

== Organizations ==
- Institution of Railway Operators (Chartered Institution of Railway Operators since October 2021)
- Internal Revolutionary Organization, Bulgaria
- International Refugee Organization, a United Nations agency 1946–1952
- International Search and Rescue Dog Organisation
- Jewish Industrial Removal Office, an agency assisting European Jewish immigrants to the U.S. in the early 20th century

== People ==
=== Given name ===
- Iro Haarla (born 1956), Finnish jazz musician
- Iro Ilk, German Luftwaffe pilot; recipient of the Knight's Cross of the Iron Cross
- Iro Konstantopoulou (1927–1944), Greek resistance member during World War II
- Iro Tembeck (1946–2004), Canadian dancer, choreographer, and dance historian

=== Surname ===
- Andy Iro (born 1984), English footballer
- Edgar Iro (born 2000), Solomon Islands swimmer
- Hapilyn Iro (born 1992), Solomon Islands weightlifter
- Kayal Iro (born 2000), Cook Islands rugby league footballer
- Kevin Iro (born 1968), New Zealand rugby league footballer
- Tony Iro (born 1967), New Zealand rugby league footballer and coach

== Places ==
- Iro (South Sudan), a mountain
- Iro Lake, Chad
- Iro town in Obafemi Owode, Nigeria

== Other uses ==
- Birao Airport (IATA code)
- Inland Revenue Ordinance, a tax law in Hong Kong
- Japanese oiler Irō, an Imperial Japanese Navy fleet oiler 1922–1944
- Mohawk hairstyle or iro

== See also ==
- Iroh, a fictional character in Avatar: The Last Airbender
- Lac Iro (disambiguation)
