= Herro =

Herro is a given name and surname. Notable people with the name include:

- Herro Mustafa (born 1973), American diplomat
- David Herro, American businessman
- Tyler Herro (born 2000), American basketball player

== See also ==
- Hero (given name)
