= Hiroo (given name) =

- Gender: Male

Origin
- Origin: Japanese
- Meaning: Different meanings depending on the kanji used

Hiroo (written: 浩生, 浩郎, 広生, 宏央, 博大, 博夫, 博雄) is a masculine Japanese given name.

== People with the name ==
Notable people with the name include:

- Hiroo Ishii (石井 浩郎; born 1964), Japanese baseball player and politician
- Hiroo Isono (磯野 宏夫; 1945–2013), Japanese painter and illustrator
- Hiroo Kanamori (金森 博雄; born 1936), Japanese seismologist
- Hiroo Kawai (河井 博大; born 1971), Japanese golfer
- Kotoryū Hiroo (琴龍 宏央; born 1972), Japanese sumo wrestler
- Masurao Hiroo (益荒雄 広生; born 1961), Japanese sumo wrestler
- Hiroo Ōhara (大原 博夫; 1894–1971), Governor of Hiroshima Prefecture
- Hiroo Onoda (小野田 寛郎; 1922–2014), Imperial Japanese Army intelligence officer
- Hiroo Shima (嶋 宏大; born 1963), Japanese ski jumper
- Hiroo Unoura (鵜浦 博夫; born 1949), Japanese businessman
- Hiroo Yamagata (山形 浩生; born 1964), Japanese writer

== See also ==
- Hiro (given name)
