= Chairo =

Chairo may refer to:

- Chairo (slang), pejorative used in Mexico to describe an individual that adheres to a far-left ideology
- Chairo (stew), a traditional dish of the Aymara people
- Chairo Christian School, a school in Drouin, Australia
- Chairon Isenia (born 1979), Dutch baseball player
- Chairon river, near Barges, Côte-d'Or, France
- Chairon, an ancient Olympic victor in wrestling
