= Matato'a =

Matato’a is a musical and dance group from Easter Island (Rapa Nui). It is one of the most famous bands from the island. Matato'a was founded in 1996 by Kevamatato’a Atan. It was in 1998 that they adopted the name of Matato'a, which means 'warrior' or 'guardian'. They played all over Chile in the same year. Mito Manutomatoma, a founding member, left the group in 1999 to play mainstream Chilean music.

The group, consisting largely of family members, uses traditional instruments, such as stones, horse jawbone, and bombo along with electric guitars and other modern elements to create a unique fusion sound.

Matato'a's principal motivation is to promote the ancestral traditions, the dances, the costumes, & body paintings of the Rapa Nui People. Performances are high-energy, with intensive indigenous cultural representation. Kevamatato’a Atan founder of the group died in May 2013

== See also ==
- Music of Easter Island
