= Pu o Hiro =

Stone on Easter Island

Coordinates: 27.093997°S 109.281884°W

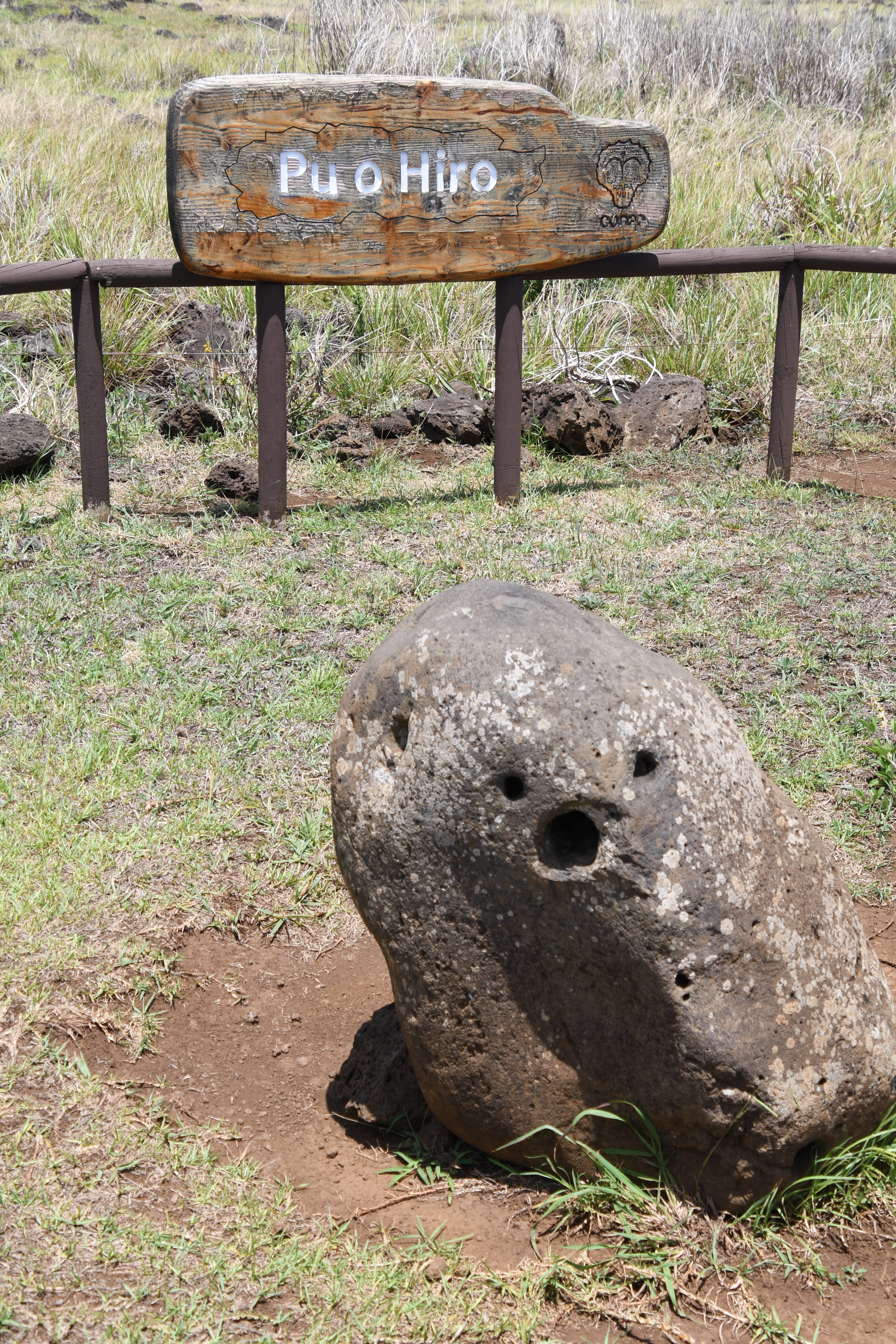
Pu o Hiro

Pu o Hiro (which means Hiro's Trumpet) is a stone on Easter Island that was used as a musical instrument by the ancient Rapa Nui. It is also known as Maea Puhi ("stone to blow" or "wind stone"). When blown through its main hole, it would produce a sound that resembled a trumpet. It was used to invoke Hiro, the deity of rain.

== Description ==
Pu o Hiro is approximately 1 to 1.25 meters tall. It is a stone aerophone. It is an ovoid rock with multiple natural holes. There is one main hole that was used to blow and three outlet holes. The main hole is natural and located at the top of the stone.

The stone has multiple petroglyphs. Some include vulva forms known as komari, a symbol of fertility.

== Uses ==
Pu o Hiro had multiple uses, although it is not clearly defined. It had been used to invoke Hiro, the rain deity. It was also used to summon a gathering of neighbors. It also could have warned of a potential enemy attack. It may also have been fishing talisman, used to make sounds that would attract fish to the shoreline. Additionally, it was a war trophy, moved around the island by the victors in battle. It may have also been used for fertility rituals.

== Location ==
Around 1250 to 1500 CE, the Pu o Hiro was located in Hanga Roa which was the main village. Today, the stone sits in a plain near Hanga o Honu. A legend states that it was brought there from Hanga Roa by a raiding party of Tupa-hotu warriors. It is located near the north coast road. Traveling eastward, it would be a few feet from the right side of the road. It is fenced off to discourage tourists from disrupting it.

== Ceremony ==
During times of drought, the Ariki Paka (subordinate chiefs) would hold a ceremony. They would dress up in ceremonial clothing. They would pray for rainfall and chant the following song:

E te uá, matavai-roa a Hiro-é
(The rain, the great tears of Hiro)
ka hoa mai koe kiraro
(Send us down)
ka rei mai koe kiraro
(Pour down)
e te u´a matavai-roa a Hiro-é
(The rain, the great tears of Hiro)

== See also ==
- Music of Easter Island
