= Chairo (slang) =

Mexican pejorative

Chairo (feminine chaira) is a pejorative epithet that originated in Mexico to describe an individual who holds a far-left ideology, specifically any person who thoughtlessly defends, idolizes, and fawns over.

The term "chairo" has indeed evolved over time and carries a specific cultural and political connotation in Mexico. Originally, it was used in the 1980s and 1990s to describe teenagers who were seen as naive or who espoused what others considered foolish or impractical ideas. The term is derived from "chaqueta mental" or "chaira mental," which metaphorically suggests someone who is "mentally masturbating"—essentially, indulging in unrealistic or impractical thoughts.

In contemporary usage, particularly in political discourse, "chairo" has taken on a more pointed meaning. It is often used pejoratively to describe individuals who are perceived as being overly idealistic, gullible, or supportive of populist or socialist policies. Critics use the term to suggest that these individuals believe in simplistic solutions to complex problems, such as the idea that wealth redistribution or government intervention alone can solve societal issues without personal effort or responsibility. The implication is that "chairos" are disconnected from reality, believing that being poor is somehow virtuous or that they are entitled to the wealth of others without contributing meaningfully to society.

This term is often used in a highly polarized political context, and its usage can be contentious. It reflects broader debates about economic policies, social justice, and the role of government in addressing inequality. As with many slang terms, its meaning can vary depending on the speaker and the context in which it is used.

Similar terms in other Spanish-speaking countries include perroflautas in Spain, zurdos in Argentina and comunachos in Chile.

== Etymology ==
In the 1960s, a chairo or chaqueto was a term used to refer to an adolescent who was believed to masturbate in excess and as a result was self-absorbed or distracted. The words have connection to chaqueta mental, literally mental jerk-off.

In her blog at El Universal, the blogger Tamara De Anda relates how she and her friends first tried to popularize chairo in high school to describe "neo-hippie" students that would take up camp in the best part of the school's garden.

In 2005, while de Anda attended the Facultad de Ciencias Políticas y Sociales, she created a satirical documentary titled Los Chairos which consisted of interviews with the "chairos" of Mexico City. This “mentally masturbation” helped increase to disseminate the term.

== Stereotype ==
The term has been further popularized by social media and now encompasses a large array of attributes. Most commonly seen as a 20-something college student, the term has also been extended to journalists, academics, writers and artists.

Common traits attributed to the chairo include: an expansive leftist-anarchist ideology, some sort of nationalist view (sometimes grounded on indigenismo, i.e. demonizing or minimizing Mexico's Hispanic heritage and exalting everything "Aztec"), being indignant and fighting "the System" and globalization. They may be against what they believe to be "Zionism" and "American imperialism". A chairo is sometimes seen as a radical that sympathizes with Socialism that is in line with Chavismo.

Other stereotypes include wearing Che Guevara shirts and smoking marijuana or ingesting peyote. As well as adhering to the philosophy of Noam Chomsky and reading the works of Eduardo Galeano.

According to the Diccionario del español de México, compiled by the Colegio de México, a chairo is an offensive adjective used to describe individuals that defend left-wing social and political causes, but lack real commitment to the causes defended; an individual that is self-satisfied with their own attitudes.

A picture of writer Daniel Malpica (editor of Radiador Magazine) became a popular image macro of the "typical chairo".

== See also ==
- Hipster (contemporary subculture) – similar in meaning to de Anda's original usage of chairo
