= Jun Sawada =

Japanese businessman

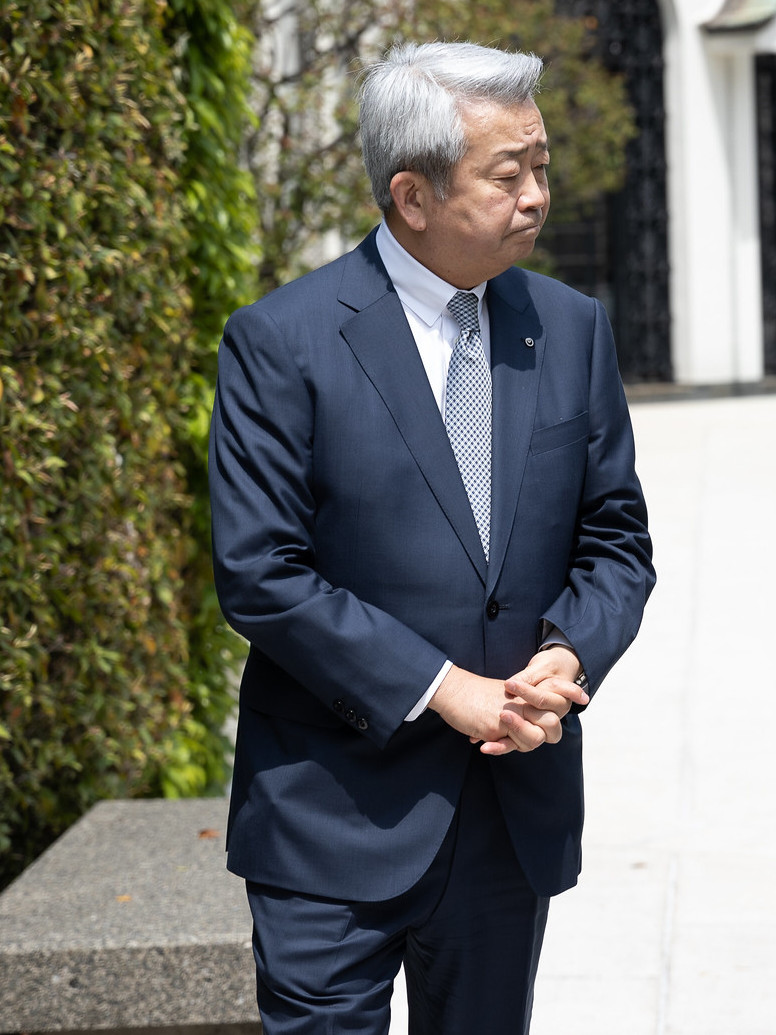
- Born: 30 July 1955 (age 70)
- Occupation: Businessman
- Title: Chairman, Nippon Telegraph and Telephone
- Term: 2022–
- Predecessor: Hiroo Unoura

Jun Sawada (澤田 純, Sawada Jun, born 30 July 1955) is a Japanese businessman, the Chairman (and former CEO) of Nippon Telegraph and Telephone (NTT), the sixth largest telecommunications company in the world in terms of revenue, since June 2022.

== Early life ==
Jun Sawada was born on 30 July 1955. He received his B.A. in Civil Engineering from Kyoto University in 1978.

== Career ==
Sawada was engaged in various leadership roles in technology developments, business incubation, enterprise sales, and corporate strategy planning and implementation since he joined NTT in 1978. After working as Senior Executive Vice President and Head of Corporate Strategy at NTT Communications, he succeeded Hiroo Unoura and was appointed President and CEO of Nippon Telegraph and Telephone Corporation in 2018. He has been Chairman and Representative Member of the Board since 2022. As of 2024, he no longer serves as a Representative Member of the Board, while continuing in his capacity as Executive Chairman of the Board.

He is Vice Chair, Chair of Committee on Industrial Competitiveness, and Chair of Committee on U.S. Affairs in KEIDANREN (Japan Business Federation), Chairman in Japan U.S. Business Council, and Co-chairperson in Kyoto Institute of Philosophy.

In April 2024, Sawada was among the guests invited to the state dinner hosted by U.S. President Joe Biden in honor of Prime Minister Fumio Kishida at the White House.

In April 2024, Sawada was honored with the Sun & Star Legacy Award by the Japan-America Society of Dallas/Fort Worth. In June 2024, Sawada was appointed an Honorary Officer of the Order of the British Empire (OBE). In May 2025, Sawada received the Diploma of Honour (Metal Romania) from the Universitatea Babeș-Bolyai in Romania.
