= Hiro Ando =

Japanese contemporary multi-disciplinary artist

- Born: 1973 (age 51–52); Island of Shikoku Japan
- Known for: Painting, sculpture, neo-pop
- Website: www.hiroando.com

Hiro Ando (born in 1973) is a Japanese contemporary multi-disciplinary artist who fuses ancient and modern Japanese traditional themes into his contemporary plastic pop-art sculptures.

== Early life and career ==
Hiro Ando was born on island of Shikoku, Japan and began his prolific career in 1995 in Tokyo. His work is inspired by Japanese pop culture, manga, and the streets of Tokyo.

His work is presented by the Paris-based Galerie Jacob Paulett gallery. Ando’s work shares the neo-pop spirit of Jeff Koons’s balloon dog figurines and Takashi Murakami’s “otaku” sculptures.

Ando is also co-founder of the neo-pop multi-artist collective studio of artists in Tokyo, called CrazyNoodles. The Crazy Noodles Studio was created by Saori Nakamishi and Hiro Ando in Tokyo in 2005 to organize and promote the creative activities of young artists of the new Japanese pop wave.

Ando issued his cat series designs In 2006, debuting a concept that would carry through the subsequent SumoCat, UrbanCat, and WarriorCat sculptural editions.

Ando created an extra white rendition of his UrbanCat creation in porcelain, the roughly 8¼- inch tall form produced in an edition of 20 signed and numbered pieces series by partnering with established producer K.Olin tribu.

== Museum collections ==
- Israel Museum of Jerusalem, SamuraiCat on the Museum : Cats and Dogs.
- Salsali Private Museum, 10th Dubai International Film Festival.

== Exhibitions ==
2018

- Ando Sculptures, Galerie Tony Rocfort, la Baule, France
- Collective Show, COVA Gallery, Eindhoven, the Netherlands
- Colors of Japan, Galerie 193, Paris, France
- Context Art Miami, ZK Gallery, San Francisco, USA
- CrazyColors CrazyNoodles, Galerie JacobPaulett, Paris France

2017

- Permanent Ando Show, Artion Gallery, Greece
- Ando Sculptures Show, ZK Gallery, San Francisco, USA
- Show CrazyNoodles, Galerie Jacob Paulett, Paris France
