= Sophia Hoare =

British photographer

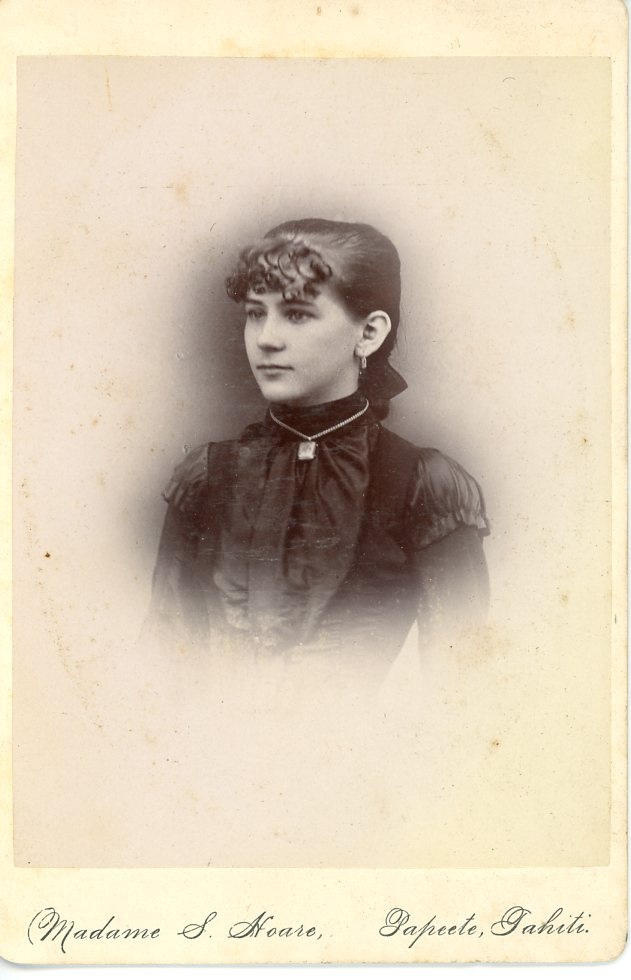
Sophia Hoare

Sophia Hoare (also known as Mrs S. Hoare, Madame S. Hoare, Suzanne Hoare, Susan Hoare), born Johnson, was a 19th-century British photographer operating in Tahiti.

She married Charles Burton Hoare, June 1853 in Manchester. They lived in Hulme outside Manchester and got three daughters, Elizabeth, Louisa, and Octavia. In March 1863 they traveled with the Telegraph ship from London to Auckland, New Zealand. Some time in the next few years, Charles, together with a certain Wooster, established a photo firm under the name of Hoare & Wooster. Wooster had a studio, "The Royal Photographic Rooms" which lay in the corner of Vulcan Lane and Queen Street. The partnership ended in 1866 and Charles started a firm in his own name, also on Vulcan Street.

== To Tahiti ==
The family eventually moved on to Tahiti, but it is unclear whether it was the whole family from start or if only Charles went first. Clearly, Charles was in Tahiti in February 1868. He then announced in Le Messager de Tahiti about his studio at College Street, Papeete, and offered cartes de visite. In June 1868, he traveled around the islands and visited îles Sous-le-Vent (Leeward Islands), probably taking some of the first pictures of the Makatea atoll in the Tuamotos. He was back in Papeete in September. He was mentioned several times in the press during 1872-1876. His pictures of Queen Pomare IV and her son (future Pomare V) are likely from this time. There are no known sources about him after 1876. His wife Sophia took over the business sometime after 1876. She is referred to as widow in 1879. Sophia drove Atelier Hoare for 30 years and photographed the royal family, among other things.

== To San Francisco ==
At the 1889 Exposition Universelle in Paris she was awarded a medal. Before 1889, she signed her pictures with "Mrs S. Hoare" and after this year she changed to "Madame S. Hoare". At the end of the 19th century Sophia had her studio on Rue de la Petite-Pologne in Papeete, but in May 1904, she and her daughter left Tahiti and boarded the SS Mariposa to San Francisco. Sophia died sometime between 1910 and 1920.

== Sophia or Susan? ==
In the literature and in various databases it is possible to find both Sophia or Susan (or Suzanne). Keith Giles uses Sophia in his article from 2011 while Jean-Yves Tréhin uses Susan in his 2003 article.

== Photos by Hoare ==
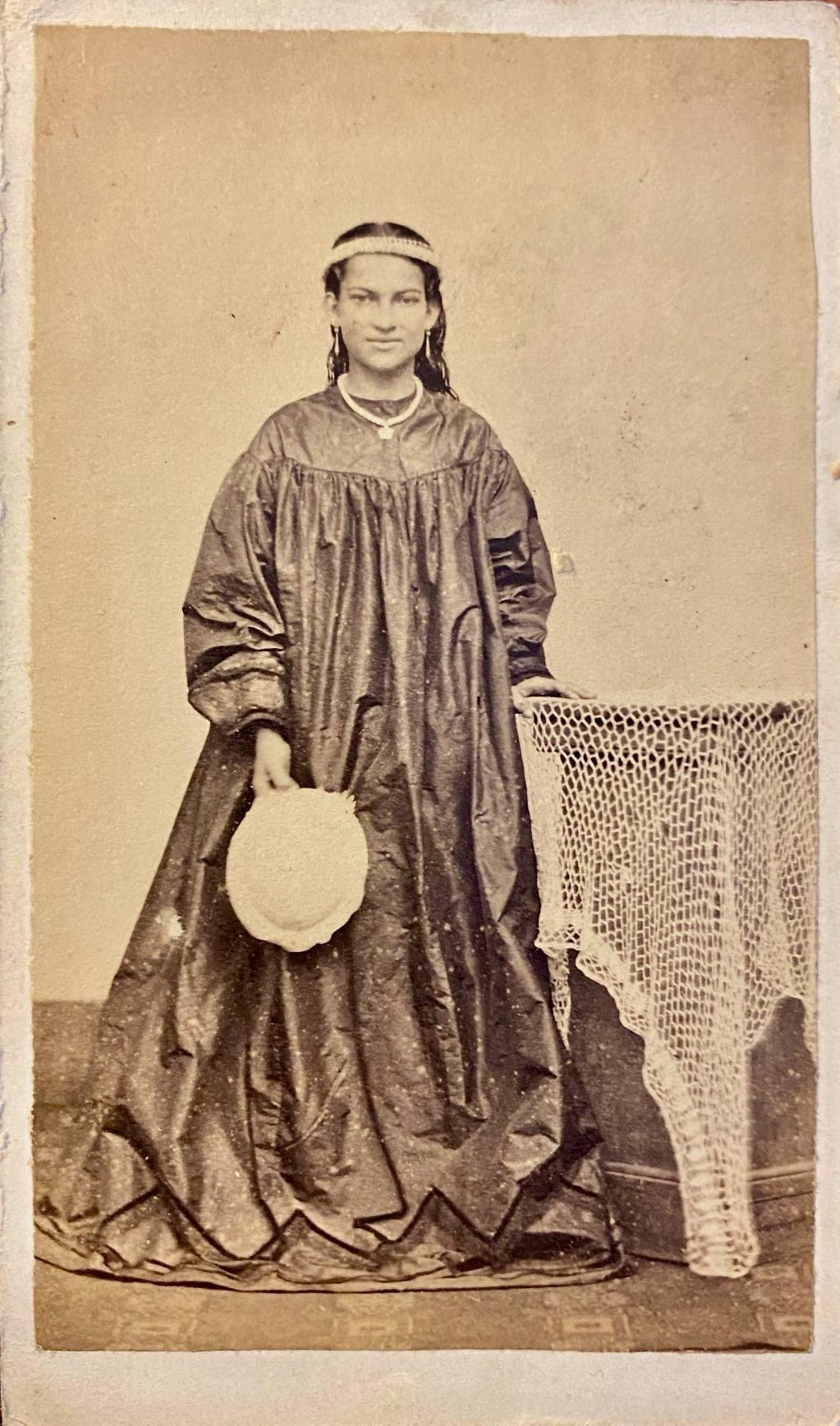
Hellen Bambridge (1852–1918), daughter of Thomas Bambridge, a British settler, and Maraea O'Connor. Photo: Hoare.

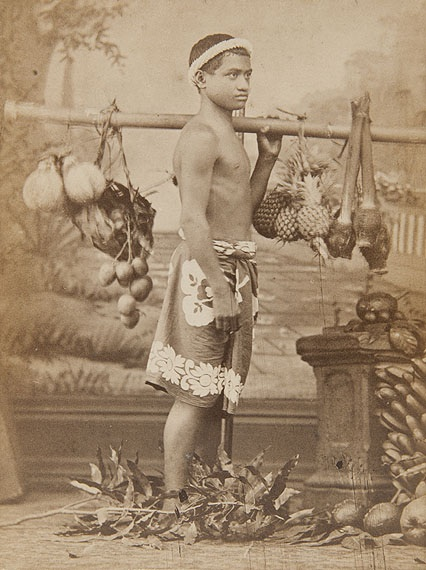
Young man with exotic fruit. Photo: Hoare.

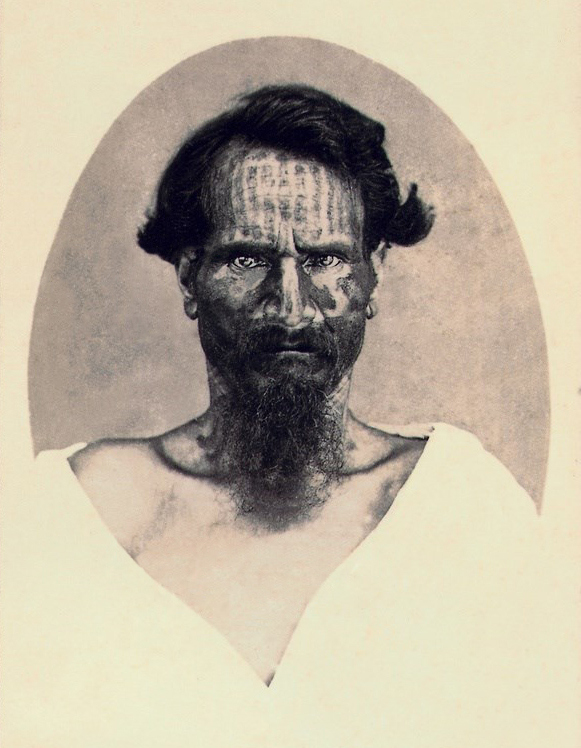
Portrait of Tepano from the Easter Island, 1870s. Photo: Hoare.

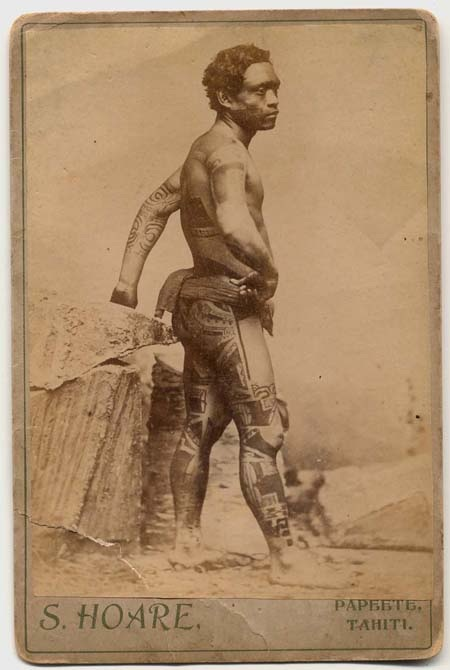
Tattooed native of the Marquesas Islands. Photo: S. Hoare.
