= Hirohisa =

- Gender: Male

Origin
- Origin: Japanese
- Meaning: Different meanings depending on the kanji used

Hirohisa (written: 裕久, 博久 or 浩久) is a masculine Japanese given name. Notable people with the name include:

- Hirohisa Fujii (藤井 裕久; born 1932), Japanese politician
- Hirohisa Horie (堀江 博久; born 1970), Japanese musician
- Hirohisa Sasaki (佐々木 浩久; born 1961), Japanese film director and screenwriter
