= HiROS =

HiROS (High Resolution Optical System) is a satellite system operating in the visible and near infra-red (NIR) optical range with a 0.5 m ground resolution. It is developed by the German Aerospace Center and will allegedly be used for espionage purposes, according to leaked diplomatic cables. The satellite has a mass of 820 kg, and can be launched from various Soyuz, Vega, or Rockot rockets. It has a revisit time of 24 h.

The project was cancelled in 2012.

== Instrument performance ==
The instrument itself has a mass of 190 kg. Its detector has a panchromatic channel between 450 and 900 nm (visible and near IR) with a ground resolution of 0.5 m. In a multichannel operation, it can achieve 2 m ground resolution. It has a signal to noise ratio of 200 and a dynamic range of 1:5000 and uses a 14 bit analog to digital converter.
