= David Herro =

American businessman and political donor

David Herro is an American businessman and Republican donor.

== Personal life and education ==
Herro received a bachelor's degree from the University of Wisconsin–Platteville in 1983 and a master's degree in Economics from the University of Wisconsin–Milwaukee in 1985.

== Career ==
After pursuing a master's degree in economics, Herro took a job starting and managing an international stock fund with Principal Financial Group. After, three plus years at The Principal Group, Herro took a similar position at The State of Wisconsin Investment Board. In 1992 Herro joined Harris Associates.. In 2006 and in 2016 Herro was named International Fund Manager of the Year by Morningstar and in 2010, Morningstar named Herro the International Stock Fund Manager of the Decade. Herro founded and serves as co-manager of Oakmark International Fund, The Oakmark International Small Cap Fund and The Oakmark Global Select Fund, all advised by Harris Associates.

== Political activities ==
Herro is a strong believer in free-market capitalism, and in supporting individuals, groups and organizations the work for equal access to quality education for underserved youth as well as policies the expand equal opportunities for all.
