= Radiador Magazine =

[Radiador] Magazine
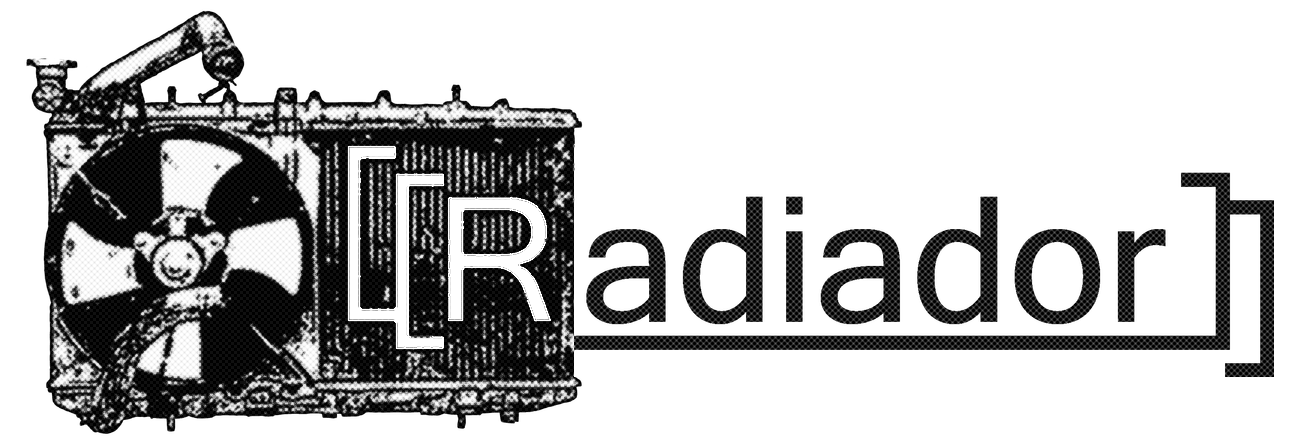

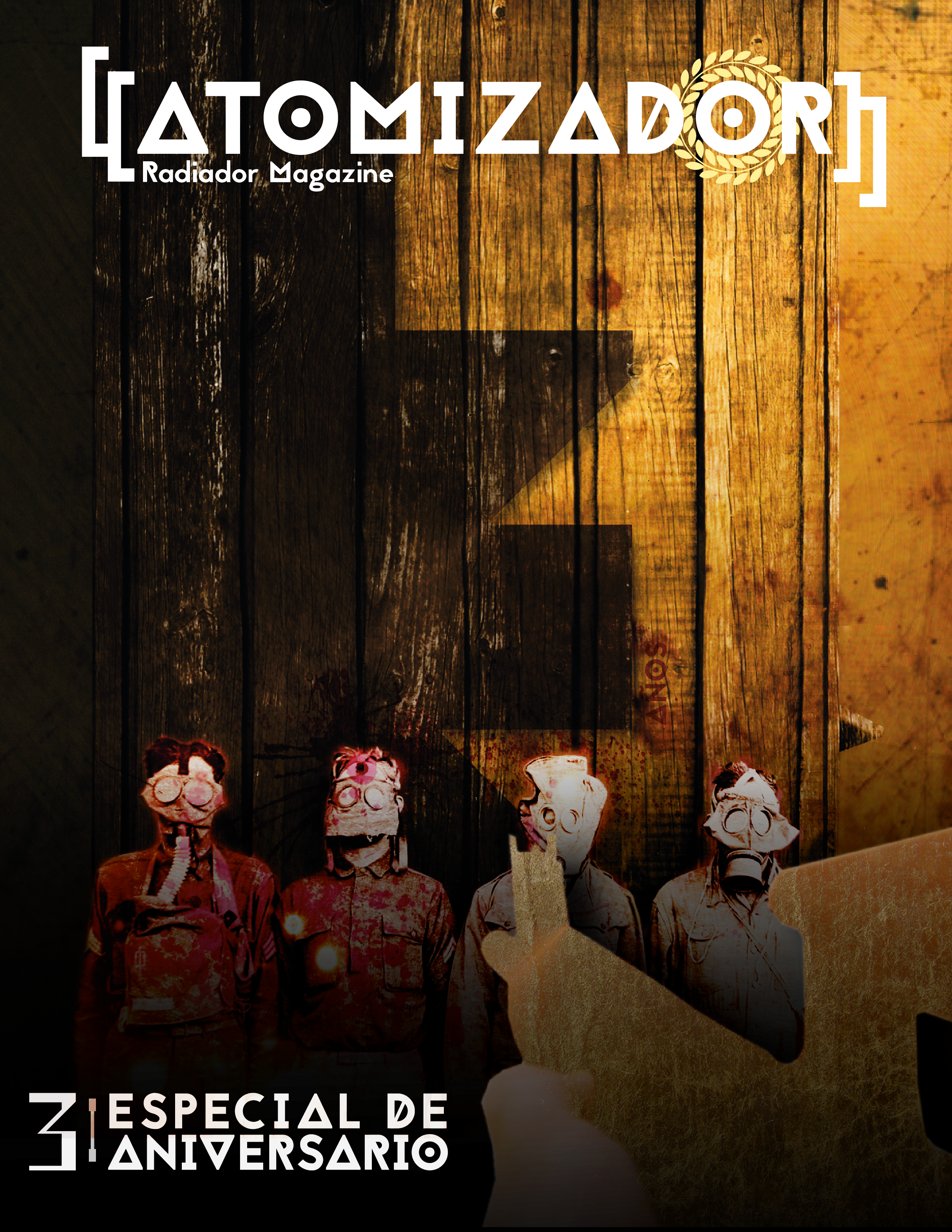
- Third anniversary issue's cover (#36) created by Daniel Malpica. A variation of the title, in this case [Atomizador], appears on the cover of [Radiador] Magazine in every anniversary issue.
- Editor: Daniel Malpica
- Staff writers: Emmanuel Vizcaya (poetry curator)
- Categories: Visual Poetry, Literature, Art
- Frequency: Monthly
- Format: Digital edition, editorial design
- First issue: Septembre 25, 2011
- Country: Mexico
- Based in: Helsinki/Mexico City
- Language: Spanish
- Website: www.radiadormagazine.com

[Radiador] Magazine ("Radiator Magazine") is a Mexico City/Helsinki-based Mexican poetry magazine in digital platform devoted to the dissemination of non-conventional literature and arts. It was founded by poet and designer Daniel Malpica, and poet Emmanuel Vizcaya in 2011.

The title of the project is an homage to Mexican avant-garde movement Stridentism, whom published Irradiador magazine in 1923. Now, [Radiador] Magazine is well known throughout Latin America and Spain for its thematic issues and rare design, its editions on visual poetry and eccentric literature aesthetics, its attention to contemporary authors by the inclusion of a monthly parts novel and international visual artists portfolios, and its constantly, and provocative, critic to the Spanish-speaking cultural and political scene.

The magazine has published an important group of contemporary writers, visual artists and intellectuals: Raul Zurita, Enrique Verástegui, Forrest Gander, José Emilio Pacheco, Carlos Monsiváis, Michael Palmer (poet), Roxana Crisólogo, Daniel Rojas Pachas, Pere Salinas, Joan Navarro, Gerardo Arana, Alexis Díaz Pimienta, Roberto Cruz Arzabal, Aurelio Meza, David Meza, Yaxkin Melchy, and Tom Barclay, among others.

Between 2013 and 2014, [Radiador] Magazine was awarded with a grant for independent magazines given by the National Council for Culture and Arts.

== History ==
[Radiador] Magazine was founded in México City in September 2011 by poets Daniel Malpica and Emmanuel Vizcaya. The name was an idea of Vizcaya influenced by Mexican stridentist movement. They launched their first edition (issue number 0) thinking of eventually migrating to a printed format, but that never happened. The project regain editorial design in the internet era, creating monthly interactive issues that can be read or downloaded for free. All their contents are supported under a Creative Commons license. About the digital platforms, Malpica, wrote:

[Radiador] Magazine [...] was initially thought of as a modest publication. We were looking to build more of a catalogue showcasing emergent poets of my country. However, after completing Issue 0, we decided to stay on board the digital platform and explore its possibilities. The response we got was surprising. The outreach of the magazine, both in readers and collaborators, went beyond national borders and became Spanish-speaking. The same can be said about the age group, now that we have readers and writers born in the 1950s to the 1990s. More than that, the e-platforms allow us to accomplish a professional monthly project in a condensed work team: Emmanuel Vizcaya (in charge of the poetry content) and myself (as editor-in-chief and designer). Thanks to the e-platforms, we are an autonomous project that works to facilitate exposure of and unite writers in Latin America.

== Staff ==
=== Founding members ===
- Daniel Malpica (Editor-in-chief and Designer)
- Emmanuel Vizcaya (Literature Curator)

=== Temporary active members ===
- Gerardo Arana: novelist and poet. / "Pegazo Zorokin" Novel in parts.
- Erick Alonso: literary essayist. / Columnist.
- David Meza: poet. / Manifesto compilation.
- Samuel González: activist, geographer and critic. / Columnist.
- Sergio Ernesto Ríos: poet. / Books diffusion.

== List of Issues ==
Edition	Title	Date
#0	Earthquake Poems	Sept.2011
#1	Epiphany poetry	Oct.2011
#2	Electro-Poetry	Nov.2011
#3	Rage	Dec.2011
#4	Brotherhood	Jan.2012
#5	Morphopoetry	Feb.2012
#6	#Twitterature	Mar.2012
#7	Fantastic Fauna	Apr.2012
#8	Tradition	May.2012
#9	Ufos	Jun.2012
#10	Special Edition - Dark Mexico	Jul.2012
#11	Chronicles	Aug.2012
#12	Special Edition - 1st Anniversary	Sept.2012
#13	The Very Best	Oct.2012
#14	Unknown poetry	Nov.2012
#15	Zombiefication	Dec.2012
#16	Geometry	Jan.2013
#17	Pornopolis	Feb.2013
#18	Elements	Mar.2013
#19	Cosmo-visions	Apr.2013
#20	Drugs	May.2013
#21	Open Source	Jun.2013
#22	Hypnosis	Jul.2013
#23	Theories	Aug.2013
#24	Special Edition - 2nd Anniversary	Sept.2013
#25	Diaspora	Oct.2013
#26	Re-Writings	Nov.2013
#27	Aphorisms and Brief literature	Dec.2013
#28	Mare Ignotum	Jan.2014
#29	Ectoplasm	Feb.2014
#30	Futurizer	Mar.2014
#31	First Time	Apr.2014
#32	.NET Poetry	May.2014
#33	Underground Poetry	Jun.2014
#34	A BB A	Jul.2014
#35	Freedom	Aug.2014
#36	Special Edition - 3rd Anniversary	Sept.2014

== Books ==
[Radiador] Magazine has published some books under the Cartonera movement using handmade techniques and recycled materials. Recently, [Radiador] Magazine has collaborated with different international organizations receiving very good answer from the European press.

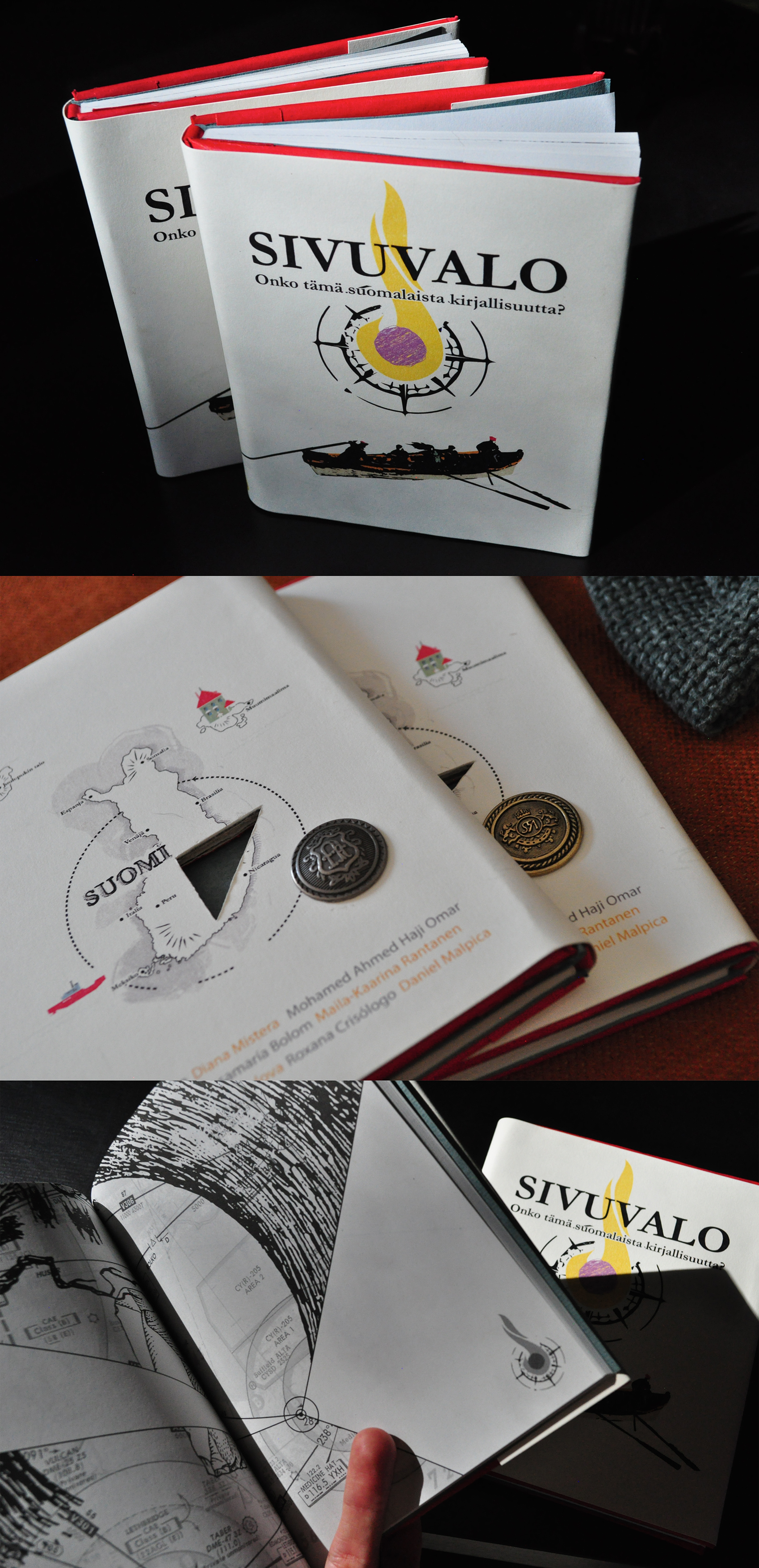
Sivuvalo: Is this Finnish Literature? - Literature compilation of international writers who lives in Finland. The book is a handmade edition developed with recycled materials.

=== List of published books ===
- Los Abisnautas: Los Abisnautas: Universitarios del Universo (Universities of the Universe), Various Authors, Poetry and Visual Arts (Ediciones Radiador, 2012)
- Pegaso Zorokin by Gerardo Arana, Novel (Ediciones Radiador, 2012)
- Met Zodiaco by Gerardo Arana, Novel (Ediciones Radiador, 2012)
- Sivuvalo: Is this Finnish Literature?, Various Authors, Poetry and Ficcion (Ediciones Radiador/Sivuvalo, 2014)
