= Topatangi =

- Genres: Polynesian Music; country; ranchera; pop-rock; folk music
- Years active: 1998–present
- Members: Tomás Tepano; Peteriko Pate; Tuki; Turo; Ceto; Bear
- Past members: Pota Pate

Topatangi is a band based in Rapa Nui, whose style is a balanced mixture of folk, country, Mexican rancheras and pop-rock, all of which seem to be musical influences that appear to coexist in Rapa Nui.

The group was created in 1998 with Tomas Tepano (Tahitian ukulele and vocals) and Peteriko Pate (lead guitar and vocals) who came together and produced a song called "Hokulea", in honour of an expedition commanded by Kitín Muñoz, who sought to discover the routes of Polynesian migrations. This song was a huge success in the small community of Rapa Nui. They decided to create a new sound by adding drums and electric bass to typical Rapanui folk music. They integrated five new band members. (Tuki (electric bass), Pota (Peteriko's son) (drums), Bear (electric guitar), Turo (percussion) and Ceto) who soon accompanied Tomas and Peteriko on a trip to Santiago, Chile to record their first album called "Moevarua", with "Hokulea" included as a track (now recorded professionally).

Given the success of the album, the group is anchored to the limited music scene of Rapa Nui, which is important as a reference to the folklore of the island.

In 2001, they recorded their second album called "Hoko hitu" (Seven). That same year, the band collaborated with a guest musician known as Marcelo Collao, who played the electric guitar.

In 2004, they recorded their third album "A'ati hoi". This album embodies the style of the group and fame beyond Rapa Nui, taking them on tour in Tahiti and New Caledonia.

The same year, the group decided to form a business partnership and opened a pub called Pub Topatangi, which was named after the band, which over time has become their meeting point.

A year later, Pota left the band, leaving a vacant space for drums. Ever since, the band constantly rotated drummers.

In 2011, the short documentary Rapa Nui: patrimonio inmaterial featured music by Topatangi.

In 2019, Topatangi opened the Identidades festival in Antofagasta.
