= Hiroo Unoura =

Ex-CEO of Nippon Telegraph and Telephone

- Born: 13 January 1949 (age 77)
- Education: University of Tokyo
- Title: CEO, Nippon Telegraph and Telephone
- Term: June 2012-June 2018
- Predecessor: Norio Wada
- Successor: Jun Sawada

Hiroo Unoura (鵜浦 博夫, Unoura Hiroo; born 13 January 1949) is a Japanese businessman, former president and chief executive officer (CEO) of Nippon Telegraph and Telephone (NTT), the third largest telecommunications company in the world in terms of revenue.

Hiroo Unoura was born on 13 January 1949. In 1973, he obtained a BA degree in Law from the University of Tokyo.

Unoura joined NTT in April 1973, and has held various senior positions at NTT. He became president and CEO in June 2012. In June 2018, he was succeeded as CEO by Jun Sawada.
