= Iro (South Sudan) =

Mountain in South Sudan

- Location within South Sudan

Highest point
- Elevation: 1,091 m (3,579 ft)
- Coordinates: 4.19006°N 32.33484°E

Geography
- Location: Eastern Equatoria, South Sudan

Iro is a mountain in South Sudan. It is located in the state of Eastern Equatoria, in the south-eastern part of the country, 110 km southeast of the capital, Juba. The top of the Iro is 1091 meters above sea level.

The terrain around Iro is flat. The highest point is near Lokiri, 1691 meters above sea level and 5.4 km north of Iro. The area is sparsely populated. There are no communities nearby. In the neighbourhood around Iro are many unusually named mountains, significantly more within 20 km radius compared to the average prevalence of named those on Earth.
