= Hirohide =

- Gender: Male

Origin
- Origin: Japanese
- Meaning: Different meanings depending on the kanji used

Hirohide (written: 汎秀, 裕英, 博英 or 丈英) is a masculine Japanese given name. Notable people with the name include:

- Hirohide Adachi (足立 丈英; born 1999), Japanese footballer
- Hirohide Fushimi (伏見 博英; 1912–1943), Imperial Japanese Navy officer
- Hirohide Hamashima (浜島 裕英; born 1952), Japanese automotive engineer
- Hirate Hirohide (平手 汎秀; 1553–1572), Japanese samurai
- Hirohide Ishida (石田 博英; 1914–1993), Japanese politician
