= Lac Iro =

Lac Iro may refer to:

- Lac Iro Department, a department in Moyen-Chari, Chad
- Lac Iro (lake), a lake in Chad
