= Herodotus (disambiguation) =

Herodotus was an ancient Greek historian.

Herodotus may also refer to:

== Persons ==
- Herodotus (physician), the name of three ancient physicians
- Herodotos of Tralles (2nd century BC), victor of the Pythian Games at the boys' stadion
- Herodotos of Klazomenai, the first Clazomenian Olympic winner, his victory being in the boys foot-race. The Clazomenians dedicated a statue of him at Olympia, Greece
- Herodotos Giorgallas (born 1977), Cypriot gymnast

== Objects ==
- Herodotus Machine, a machine described by Herodotus, used by the Egyptians to construct the pyramids

== Places ==
- Mons Herodotus, a mountain on the Moon
- Herodotus (crater), a crater on the Moon
- 3092 Herodotus, a main belt asteroid
