= Rapa Nui people =

Indigenous Polynesian people of Easter Island

Rapa Nui
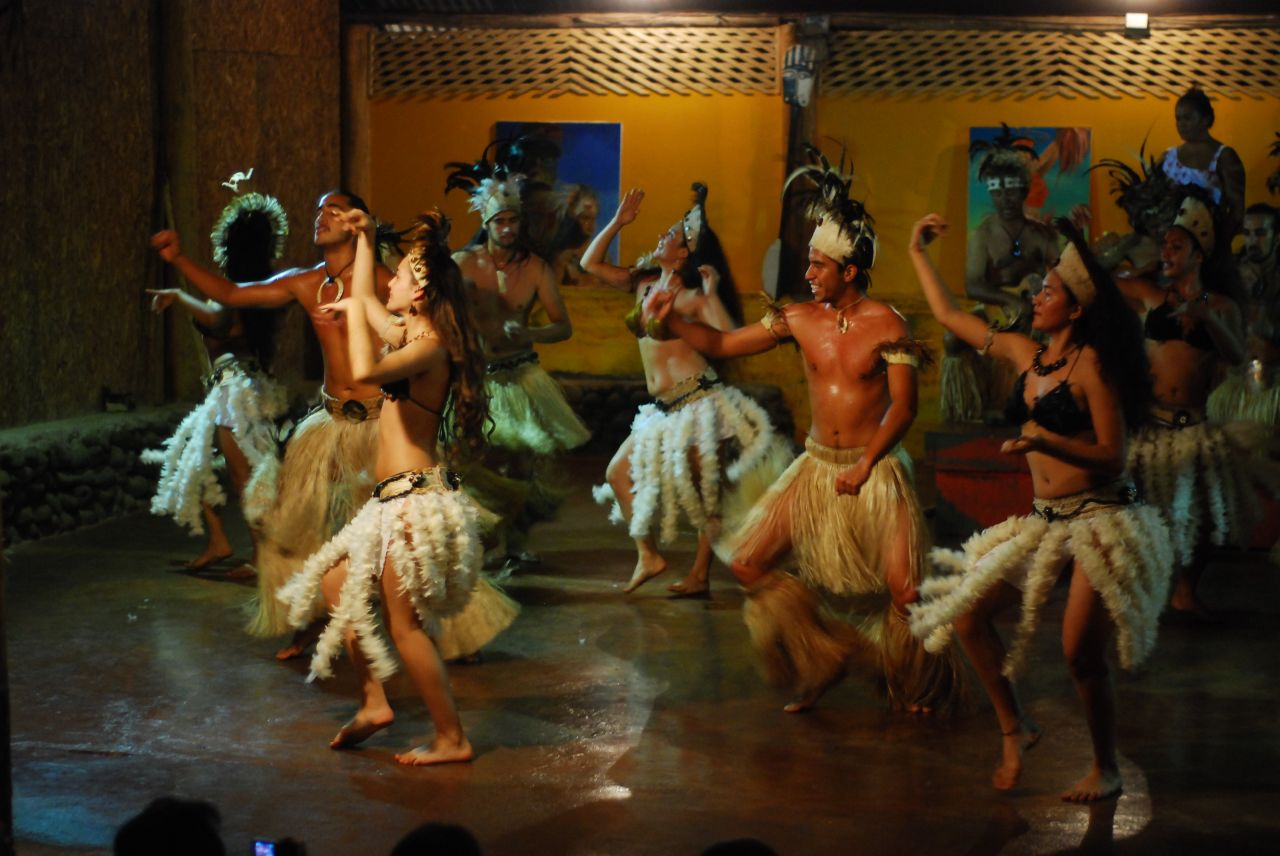
- Traditional dance of Rapa Nui people

Total population
- 6,659 (2024)

Regions with significant populations
- Chile (particularly Easter Island)

Languages
- Rapa Nui, Chilean Spanish

Religion
- Christianity, Rapa Nui mythology

Related ethnic groups
- Oparoan, Tahitian

The Rapa Nui (Rapa Nui: [ˈɾapa ˈnu.i], Spanish: [ˈrapa ˈnu.i]) are the Indigenous Polynesian peoples of Easter Island. The easternmost Polynesian culture, the descendants of the original people of Easter Island make up about 60% of the current Easter Island population and have a significant portion of their population residing in mainland Chile. They speak Rapa Nui and Chilean Spanish. At the 2017 census there were 7,750 island inhabitants—almost all living in the village of Hanga Roa on the sheltered west coast.

As of 2011, Rapa Nui's main source of income derived from tourism, which focuses on the giant sculptures called moai.

Over the past decade, Rapa Nui activists have been fighting for self-determination and sovereignty over their lands. Protests in 2010 and 2011 by the Indigenous Rapa Nui on Easter Island, objecting to the creation of a marine park and reserve, have led to clashes with Chilean police.

== History ==
=== Pre-European contact ===
Rapa Nui are believed to have settled Easter Island between 300 and 1200 CE. Previously, the date of arrival was estimated to be around 700–800 CE, but more-recent evidence from radiocarbon dating supports an arrival date as late as 1200 CE. The Rapa Nui people have been found to be of Polynesian origin through genetic analysis of mitochondrial DNA of pre-historic skeletons. Genetic analysis in 2007 revealed genetic markers that suggest that the Rapa Nui had European and Amerindian contributions to their DNA during or before the early 1800s. Later genetic analyses found Indigenous American genetic admixture to Polynesian peoples, including the Rapa Nui, hundreds of years prior to contact with Europeans.

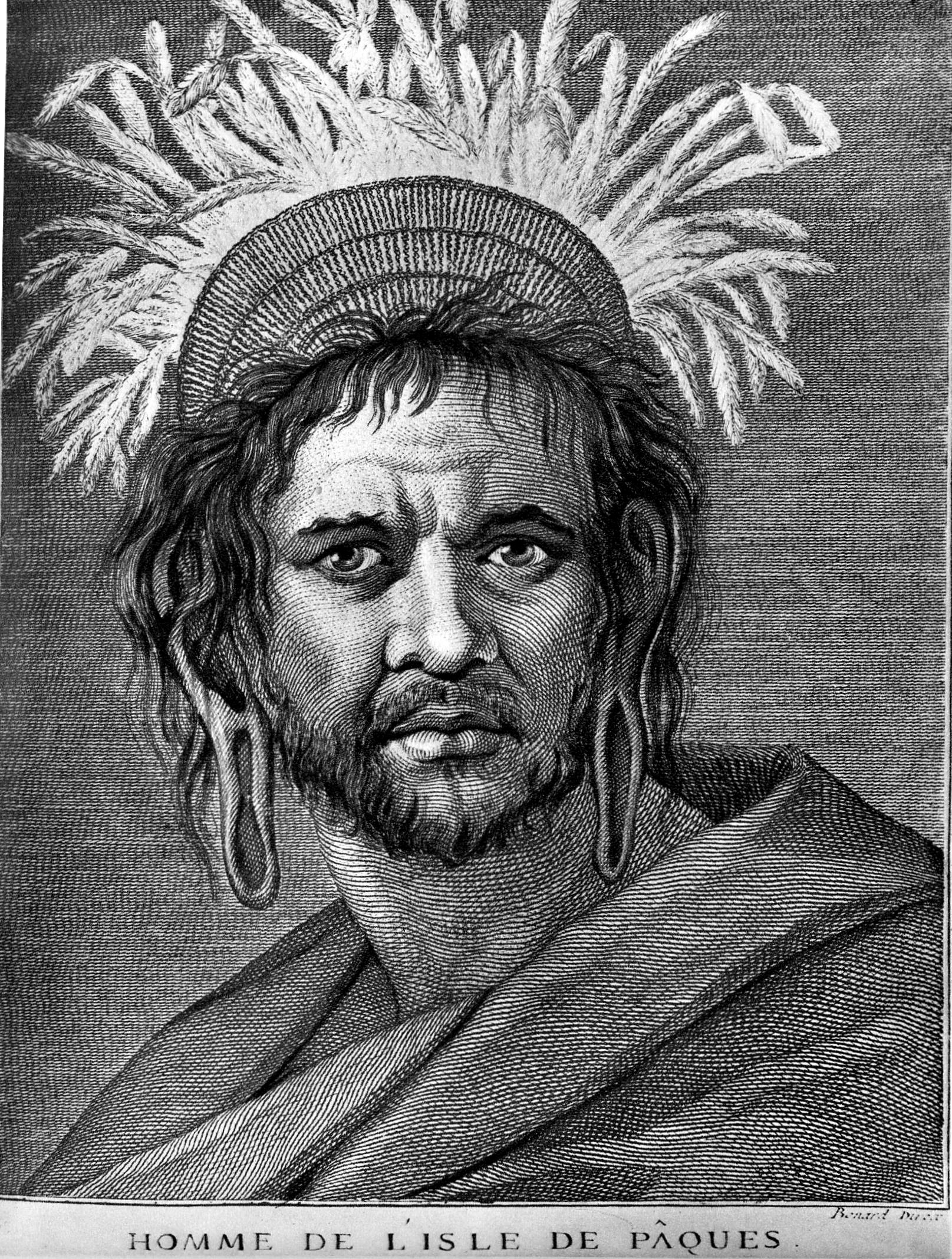
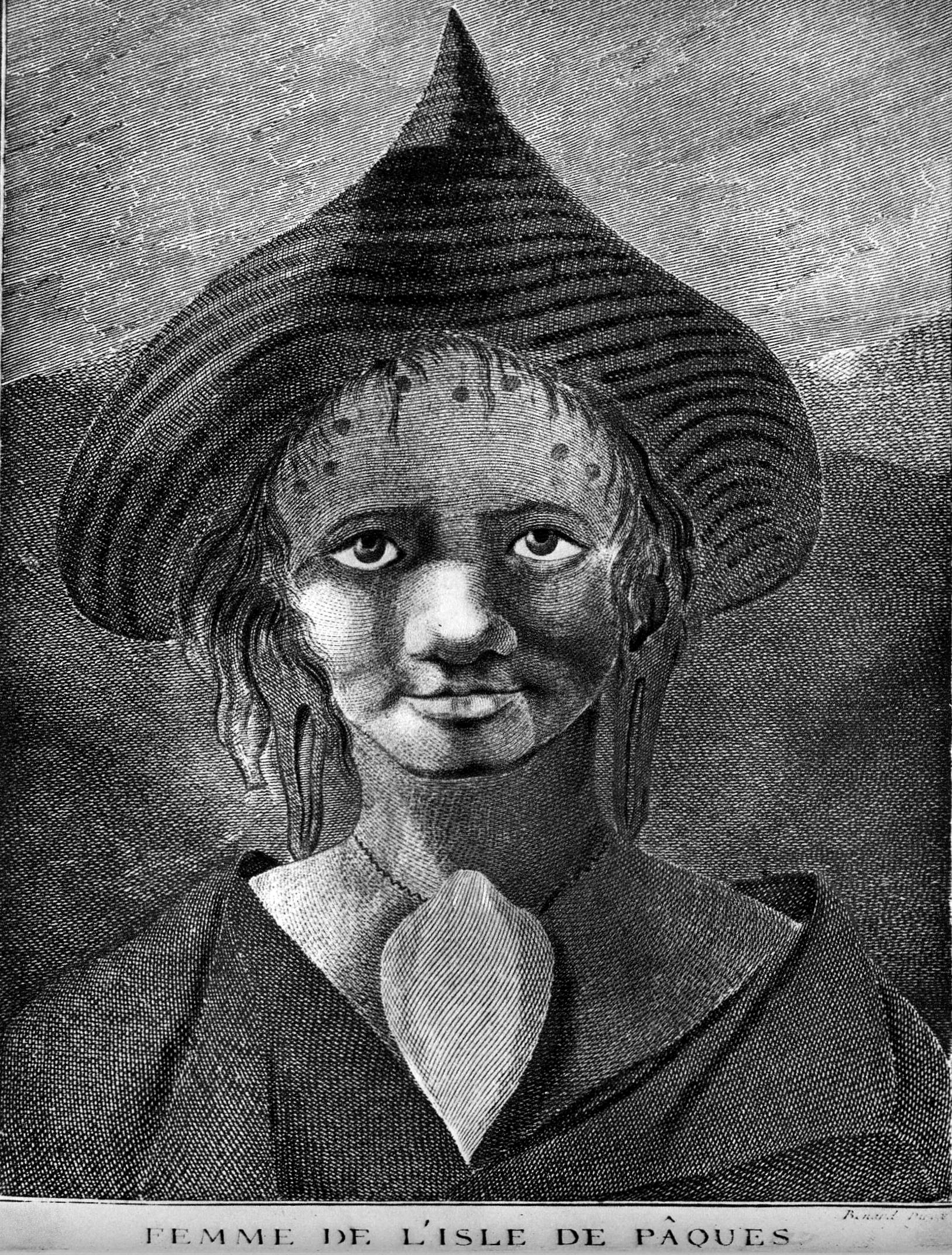
Drawing of Easter Island man and woman, by William Hodges, 1777

=== Early European contact (1722–1870 CE) ===
Jacob Roggeveen was the first European to record contact with the Rapa Nui. Roggeveen allegedly set sail either in search of Juan Fernández Islands or the supposed "Davis Land" but instead arrived at Easter Island on April 5, 1722 (Easter Sunday). He remained on the island for about a week. Felipe González de Ahedo visited the Rapa Nui in 1770 and claimed the island for Spain on a document which the islanders wrote on in rongorongo, the Rapa Nui script, which is no longer understood. James Cook and Jean-François de Galaup, comte de Lapérouse, visited the island for a few days in 1774 and 1786, respectively.

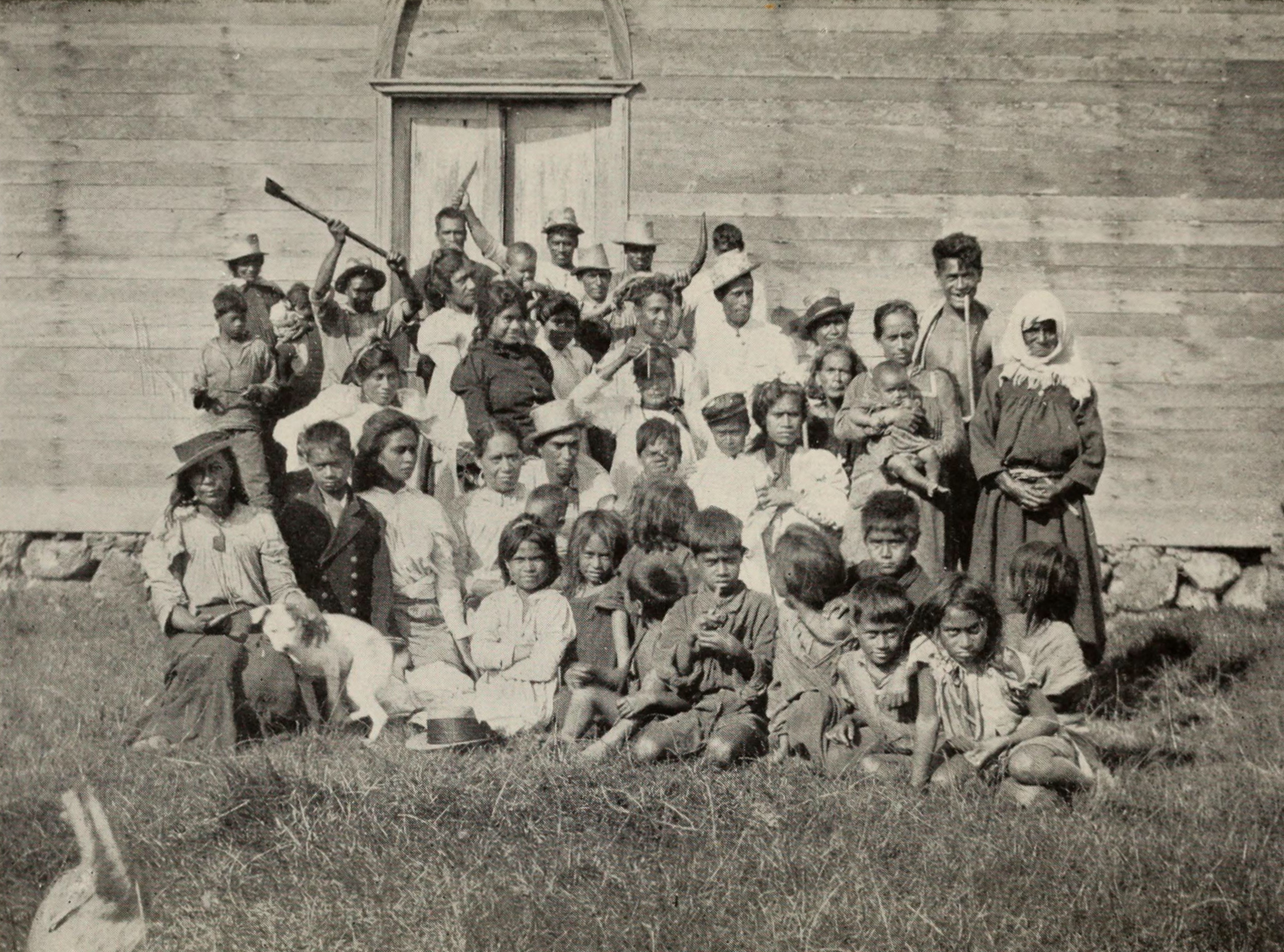
Group of Rapa Nui people at Hanga Roa, c. 1914

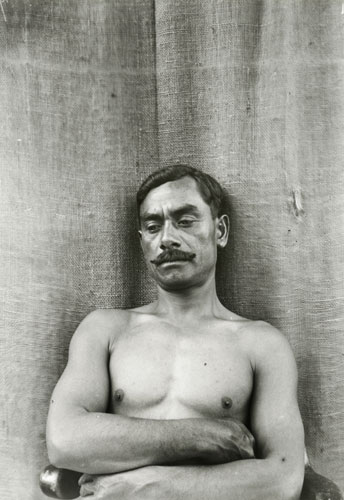
Juan Tepano Rano ʻa Veri ʻAmo (1867–1947), a full-blood Rapa Nui and Chilean military officer, while serving in the 1915 Mana Expedition (23 July 1915).

== Culture ==
=== Language ===
The Rapa Nui currently speak Spanish and the traditional Rapa Nui language. The Rapa Nui language, also known as Pascuan, is classified as an Eastern Polynesian language and is currently written in the Latin script. Rapa Nui is a minority language, as most Rapa Nui people speak Spanish as their first language. Spanish is the most widely spoken language on Easter Island and the primary language of education and administration. It is believed that Rapa Nui is currently undergoing a shift toward more Spanish-like sentence structure. Rongorongo, a system of glyphs discovered in the 1800s, is believed to represent an older version of the Rapa Nui language. However, the decipherment of rongorongo is an ongoing process and it is not yet clear whether Rongorongo is a form of writing or some other form of cultural expression.

=== Mythology ===
The main stories of Rapa Nui mythology are that of Hotu Matu'a, believed to be the first settler of Easter Island, and the Tangata manu. The Tangata manu is the mythology of the Birdman religion and cult which had creator god Makemake and competition with eggs to choose the birdman who would remain sacred for five months. More recent Rapa Nui mythology includes the story of the epic battle between the Hanau Epe and the Hanau Momoko.

The trans-Neptunian dwarf planet Makemake is named after this creator deity.

=== Moai ===
The best-known aspect of the Rapa Nui culture is the moai, the 887 human figures carved from rock between 1250 and 1500 CE and transported throughout Easter Island. The moai were believed to be the living faces of ancestors and had all been toppled by 1868. The moai rest on large stone platforms called ahu, the most famous of which are Ahu Tongariki, the largest ahu, and Ahu Vinapu. Some moai have hats of red volcanic stone known as Pukao. Currently, the Rapa Nui and the Chilean government are focused on preserving and restoring the statues. Rapa Nui National Park, which includes many of the statues, is a World Heritage site.

=== Art ===
The Rapa Nui have historically made feather headdresses, bark cloth, wood carvings, and stone carvings. Adzes, blunt round stones, were used to complete stone images and wood carvings. A distinguishing characteristic of Rapa Nui statues is the use of shell or coral inlaid with obsidian to represent eyes.

=== Music ===
Rapa Nui traditional music consists of choral singing and chanting accompanied by instruments including conch shell trumpets, percussive dancers, accordions, and kauaha, a percussion instrument created from the jaw bone of a horse. Modern Rapanui music has had influences creating new genres such as the Rapa Nui style of tango. Matato'a, one of the most famous musical groups on the island, promotes traditional styles of dance and music.

=== Tattoos ===
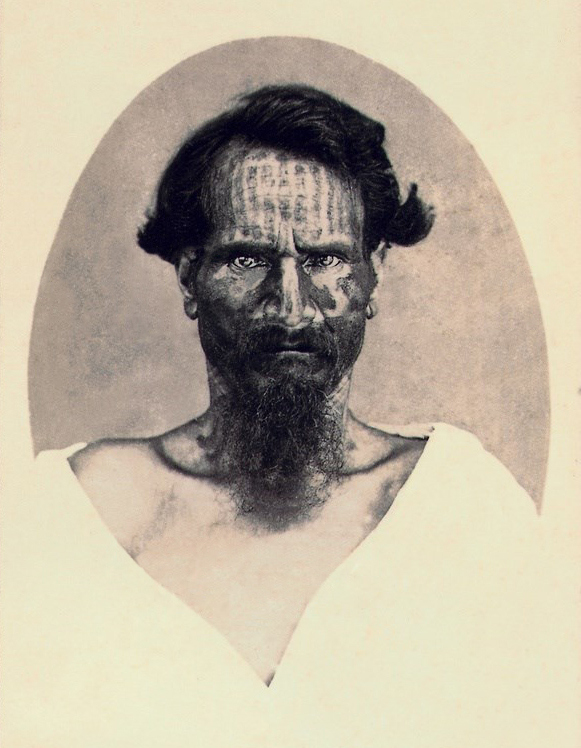
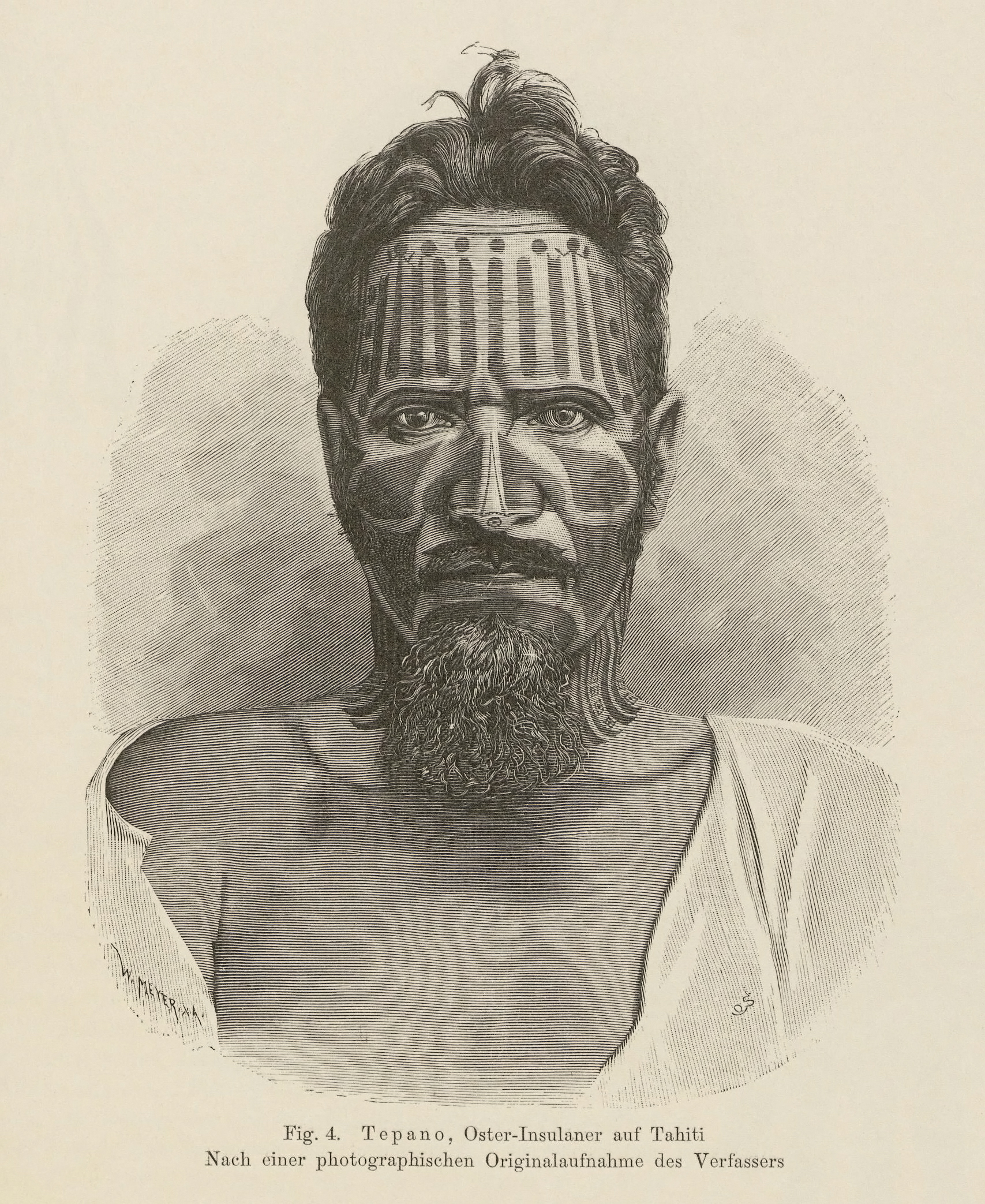
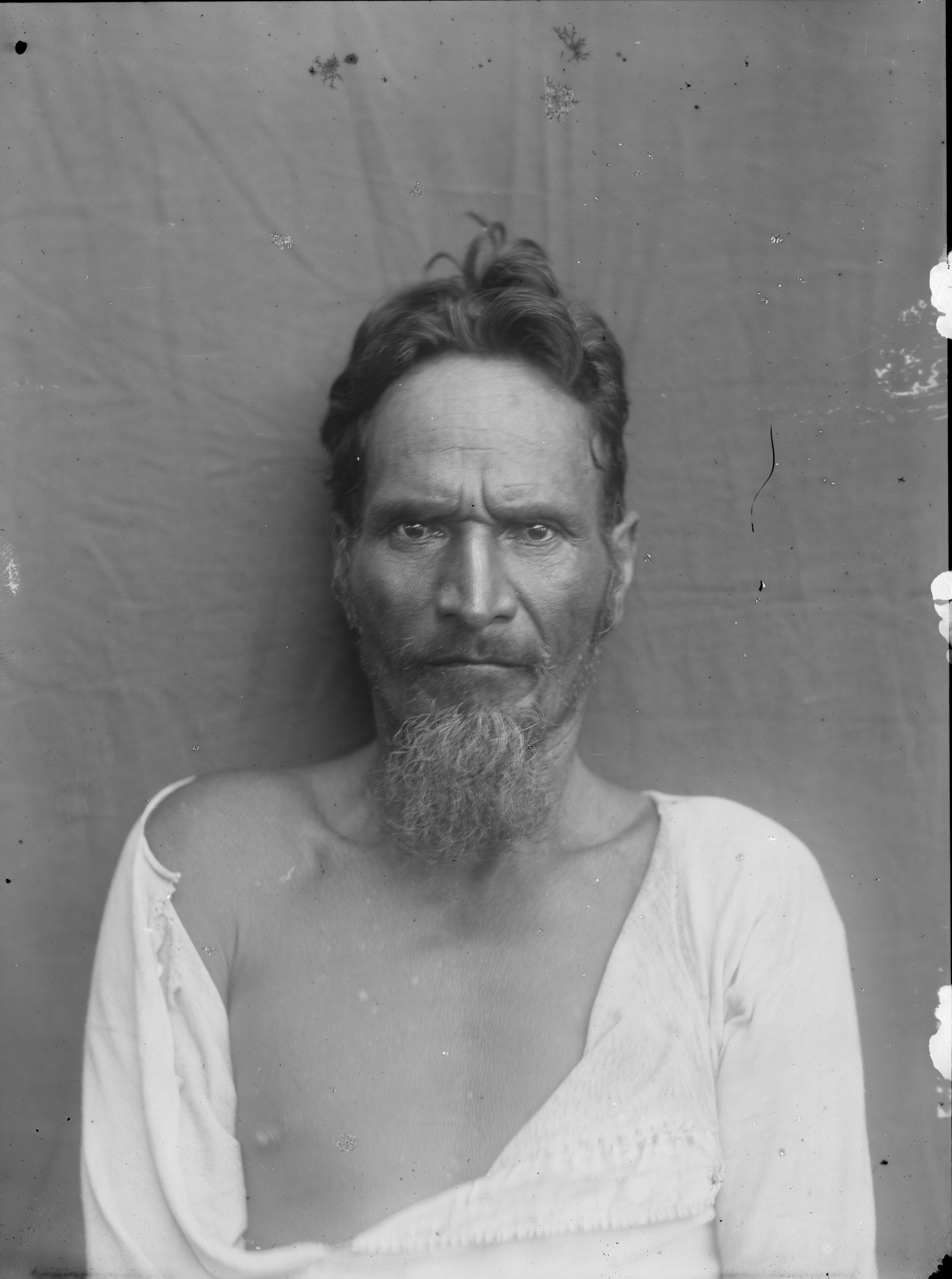
Tepano, a man from Rapa Nui with tattoos on his face. Left picture is photographed in the 1870s by Sophia Hoare in Tahiti. Middle is an engraving after sketches by Hjalmar Stolpe in Tahiti 1884 during the Vanadis expedition, and right is a photo by Oscar Ekholm in 1884. It is very hard to see any traces of the tattoos on the right picture, something Stolpe also writes in his article 1899.

Like in other Polynesian islands, tattoos and body paintings had a fundamentally spiritual connotation. In some cases the tattoos were considered a receptor for divine strength or mana. They were manifestations of the Rapa Nui culture. Priests, warriors and chiefs had more tattoos than the rest of the population, as a symbol of their hierarchy. Both men and women were tattooed to represent their social class. Tattoos, as well as other forms of art in Rapa Nui, blends anthropomorphic and zoomorphic imagery. Nowadays, young people are bringing back Rapa Nui tattoos as an important part of their culture and local artists base their creations on traditional motifs.

The tattooing process was performed with bone needles and combs called Uhi made out of bird or fish bones. The ink was made out of natural products, primarily from the burning of Ti leaves (Cordyline terminalis) and sugar cane.

=== Cuisine ===
Pascuense cuisine, otherwise known as Easter Island cuisine or Rapa Nui cuisine incorporates the influences of the Indigenous Rapa Nui people and America. Notable ingredients include seafood such as fish, octopus (heke), eel, sea snails (pipi) and crustaceans (lobster), as well as sweet potato, taro, banana, pineapple, coconut, pumpkin, and poultry, pork and lamb meat. Traditional foods include umu, meat, fish, vegetables and fruit wrapped in banana leaves and roasted in umu pae – an earth oven. Po'e, pudding made of mashed bananas, pumpkin and flour is baked in the umu pae as well. Other favorite dishes are tunu ahi, fish grilled on hot stones, or ceviche. Pascuense cuisine also includes meat dishes, such as pork or mutton ribs.

== Interaction with the environment ==
An apparent decline of Rapa Nui culture and society before European arrival in 1722 has been hypothesised to have been caused by the over-exploitation of the island's environment, most notably through deforestation of almost all the island's trees. This idea that Rapa Nui society collapsed came out of the imbalance between general resources present on the island, mainly population, timber, and food, and the energy- and resource-intensive feat of transporting and raising the moai. Genetic studies of Rapa Nui people have shown that there was not a pre-contact population collapse.

The most prominent proponent of this explanation was Jared Diamond, who proposed a scenario for the "ecocide" on Easter Island in his 2005 book Collapse. Food resources may have been scarcer than in other areas of Polynesia because of factors like cooler climate, relative lack of rainfall, and high winds that lead to lower yields of common Polynesian crops, and a lack of biodiversity. A source of good timber is also currently absent from the island. Deforestation could have decreased crop yields due to soil erosion. Loss of wood could have necessitated a halt to the construction of fishing boats and of the moai. Although Easter Island currently has only 48 different kinds of plants as evidenced by botanical surveys of the island, it once possessed many more, shown through pollen analysis conducted on sediment layers from swamps or ponds. Plants no longer on the island include a giant palm, the Rapa Nui Palm, that showed signs of having been the largest palm species in the world, eclipsing the size of the Chilean Wine Palm. There are also signs of Easter Island's once possessing more diverse fauna; for example, the skeletal remains of 25 different species of nesting bird have been found on the island, but only 16 are currently observed. A trend of extinction and extirpation is a common occurrence when humans populate a new area because of what Diamond believes to be a tendency to overhunt and overexploit resources. Diamond hypothesizes that resource scarcity may have led to a civil war and resulting drop in population from 7,000 individuals pre-war to the 2,000 found in the first census of the island by missionaries in the 19th century.

More recent pollen surveys of sediment cores have found the decline in certain plant species on Rapa Nui to have been uneven and gradual, occurring due to a variety of factors including drought, forest clearing, and feedback between human activity and landscape.

Population decline of the Rapa Nui people has been linked to the arrival of Europeans and the diseases that commonly came with them, like smallpox, with several researchers having argued that pre-colonial Rapa Nui society was rather stable.

=== Agriculture ===
Agriculture on Easter Island shows signs of intensification before European arrival, necessary because of its climate which had an excess of wind and a low amount of rainfall for the area. Archaeological finds show a multitude of composting pits and irrigation systems. Large boulders were also stacked to serve as barriers against the wind. In the fields, a system of agriculture called lithic mulch was employed. In this method, farmers would lay rocks out in patterns in their fields, forcing the plants to grow in certain areas. This method is known to increase soil moisture while decreasing soil erosion from wind, effectively combating the climate conditions.

Crops grown on Easter Island included sweet potatoes, yams, taro, bananas and sugarcane. Chickens were the sole domestic animal, though the "chicken coops" carved of stone which still dot the fields of the island were most likely tombs from which the chickens obtained calcium and phosphorus in the form of bone meal.

== See also ==
- Rapa-Nui (film)
- Hotu Matu'a
- History of Easter Island
- Indigenous peoples in Chile
