= Killing of Walter Wallace =

October 2020 death of a man after a shooting in Philadelphia, Pennsylvania

- Frame from video of Wallace walking towards Philadelphia police officers moments before he was shot on October 26, 2020
- Date: October 26, 2020
- Time: 4 p.m. EDT
- Location: 6100 Locust Street, Cobbs Creek, Philadelphia, Pennsylvania, U.S.; 39.957928°N 75.243799°W
- Type: Shooting
- Participants: Sean Matarazzo; Thomas Munz
- Deaths: Walter Wallace
- Charges: none
- Shooting of Walter Wallace Jr. (Philadelphia) Shooting of Walter Wallace Jr. (Pennsylvania) Shooting of Walter Wallace Jr. (the United States)

On October 26, 2020, Walter Wallace Jr., a 27-year-old African American man, was fatally shot by Philadelphia police officers Sean Matarazzo and Thomas Munz at 6100 Locust Street in the Cobbs Creek section of Philadelphia, Pennsylvania. The two officers arrived in the area to respond to a domestic dispute. When they arrived, Wallace walked out of his house carrying a knife. The two officers backed away while telling him to drop the knife shortly before they each fired several rounds at Wallace, hitting him in the shoulder and chest. He later died from his wounds in the hospital. Wallace's family stated that Wallace was having a mental health crisis.

Wallace's killing gained attention after a cellphone video of the incident was posted to social media platforms, where it went viral. Protests against the killing occurred throughout Philadelphia in late October. Peaceful protests took place, as well as several protests which escalated into violence and looting, leading to arrests, injuries to police and protesters, deployment of the Pennsylvania National Guard, and a citywide curfew.

== People involved ==
- Walter Wallace Jr., a 27-year-old unemployed man, aspiring rapper and father of eight who was married in October 2020. He worked occasionally as an Uber Eats driver. According to family members and the family's attorney, Wallace suffered from mental illness, including bipolar disorder, and was taking lithium. Between 2013 and 2020, Wallace pled guilty to several criminal charges, including assaulting a police officer in 2013. In 2017 he pleaded guilty for grabbing a woman and putting a gun to the woman's head which he served two years in prison. And was repeatedly ordered by judges to undergo psychiatric evaluation and treatment. At the time of his death he was awaiting trial for allegedly threatening to shoot his ex. A funeral service for him was held on November 7, 2020, at the National Temple Baptist Church in North Philadelphia.
- Sean Matarazzo, a 25-year-old Philadelphia police officer who joined the department in 2018.
- Thomas Munz, a 26-year-old Philadelphia police officer who joined the department in 2017. Munz died on May 24, 2022, after an off-duty motorcycle crash.

== Shooting ==
On October 26, 2020, police attended three separate times to Wallace's parents' house on the 6100 block of Locust Street in the predominantly black neighborhood of Cobbs Creek, Philadelphia. Around 3:45 p.m., during their third arrival, Officers Sean Matarazzo and Thomas Munz came in response to reports of a person screaming and a man assaulting an elderly female. Several 9-1-1 calls were made by Wallace's sister, brother, and neighbor, telling dispatchers that Wallace was assaulting his parents. Wallace's sister asked for a medic on the scene as her mother's blood pressure was rising and her father was feeling faint, also informing the dispatcher that Wallace was on probation and had a criminal record. Police Commissioner Danielle Outlaw said the police dispatch prior to the shooting said, "Tell the officers to use caution in responding to this, it’s an ongoing domestic issue going on up there." It is unknown if the officers were familiar with Wallace prior to their arrival.

At 3:48 p.m., the responding officers arrived at the house, standing about 15 feet away from the front. An unknown person from inside the house said, "Put the knife down," three times. Wallace then walked out of his house and onto his porch carrying a knife in his right hand. Both officers drew their guns and yelled for Wallace to "put the knife down" around 11 times. Wallace walked down his front steps and towards the officers. He then turned away from the officers and walked towards the other end of the street. His mother followed him into the street and attempted to grab him before he brushed her aside as officers asked her to move away from Wallace. An unknown woman yelled to the officers that Wallace was "mental" multiple times. Wallace then walked back into the street while Matarazzo and Munz continued to aim their guns at him, repeating for him to "put the knife down".

Wallace's mother told the officers not to shoot him moments before shots were fired. An unknown man said "Get him," and "Shoot him," before each officer fired about seven times, with an unknown number of shots hitting Wallace. Wallace's mother ran to him as he was dying, and yelled at officers, "You killed my son!" The shots hit Wallace in the shoulder and chest. One of the officers placed Wallace in a police vehicle and drove him to the hospital where he was pronounced dead shortly after arriving.

The officers involved in the shooting were moved to desk duty pending an investigation.

== Investigation ==
=== Family response ===
The attorney for the Wallace family, Shaka Johnson, said the family had called for an ambulance to get Wallace help with a mental health crisis, not for police intervention, and that Wallace was suffering from bipolar disorder. Wallace's parents said officers knew their son was in a mental health crisis because they had been to the family's house three times on October 26. The family does not want murder charges filed against the officers, and intend to file a wrongful death lawsuit. They also called for the police department's responses to mental health crises to change.

=== Local investigations ===
On November 4, the officers involved in the shooting were identified. Investigations into the shooting by the PPD's Officer-Involved Shooting Investigation Unit and the Special Investigations Unit of the District Attorney's office are ongoing.

=== Cellphone video and body camera footage ===
Wallace's killing first received attention on social media, where a cellphone video of the incident captured by onlooker JaHiem Simpson was posted to social media, subsequently going viral. On October 30, the Wallace family reviewed footage from police body cameras worn by Matarazzo and Munz during the shooting. Johnson stated that, based on the footage, Wallace was suffering from an "obvious mental health crisis" and he was incapacitated after the first shot. On November 4, part of the footage was released to the public, marking the first time in the PPD's history that body camera footage for a police shooting was publicly released. According to District Attorney Krasner, who called the footage "traumatic" and "painful" in a press conference before its release, only the portion of the footage that the Wallace family felt was appropriate to share was released. The department also released a series of 9-1-1 calls made by several individuals, including Wallace's sister and brother, as well as one of Wallace's neighbors.

== Reactions ==
Wallace's father, Walter Wallace Sr., stated his son had mental health issues and was on medication and asked why the police did not use a Taser instead.

Philadelphia Mayor Jim Kenney said the shooting raised "difficult questions that must be answered". Police Commissioner Danielle Outlaw noted that neither officer was equipped with a Taser, adding that the department only had around 2,300 Tasers at the time of the shooting, which Outlaw said she intended to increase to 4,500. She also said that she would be creating a behavioral health unit within the PPD as well as a directory for officers that lists mental health resources available during all hours of the day. She added that the department would begin crisis intervention training with dispatchers which would help them better identify crisis-related calls for specially trained officers to handle alongside civilian mental health experts.

Fraternal Order of Police President John McNesby showed support for the officers, saying, "Our police officers are being vilified for doing their job and keeping the community safe, after being confronted by a man with a knife. We support and defend these officers."

The then-presidential nominee Joe Biden and his running mate Kamala Harris published a joint statement saying, "Our hearts are broken for the family of Walter Wallace Jr... We cannot accept that in this country a mental health crisis ends in death."

== Protests and riots ==
Protests and demonstrations against police brutality and institutional racism in response to Wallace's killing took place across Philadelphia throughout late October. Peaceful demonstrations took place, while others escalated into rioting. According to Philadelphia officials, there was a total of 225 arrests, 60 injured police officers, 617 incidents of looting, 18 damaged vehicles, and 24 ATM explosions during the protests.

On October 27, the state and city authorities requested help from the Pennsylvania National Guard, which then mobilized several hundred soldiers. Residents from several districts of Philadelphia were instructed by police to stay indoors to avoid "widespread demonstrations that have turned violent with looting". In response to the protests, Philadelphia announced a citywide curfew on October 28 from 9:00 pm on October 28 to 6:00 am the following day.

On October 30, Pennsylvania Governor Tom Wolf deployed the National Guard to Philadelphia and stationed them outside City Hall and the Municipal Services Building. Another curfew was imposed, beginning at 9 pm on October 30 and ending at 6 am on October 31. Two men were charged with felony possession of weapons of mass destruction after illegal explosives, bolt cutters and machetes were found in their van. Officials said the two men were attempting to blow up ATMs.

Additional protests against Wallace's killing took place in Portland and Brooklyn.

=== Rickia Young beating ===
Video footage from the protests on October 27 also showed a slow-moving SUV being surrounded by police. Officers with batons surrounded the vehicle, broke its windows, pulled its driver and a passenger, Rickia Young and her teenage nephew, from the car, threw them onto the ground, and then pulled Young's 2-year-old son from the backseat. Young had to be taken to the hospital for injuries sustained in the arrest and was later released without charges.

The National Fraternal Order of Police posted a photo of a policewoman holding Young's son to Twitter and Facebook, claiming that the child had been found wandering the streets and that they were protecting him. The Young's family attorney accused the police union of lying in the post showing an officer carrying the toddler, which was later removed, and according to the police union, they "learned of conflicting accounts of the circumstances" over how the toddler ended up in the hands of police. The city paid Young an out-of-court settlement of $2 million in September 2021.

The officer accused of beating Rickia Young, Darren Kardos, was subsequently fired. He was charged with assault in April of 2022 and acquitted by a jury in July of 2023.

=== Reactions ===
Both Wallace's father and his cousin, Anthony Fitzhugh, decried any looting or violence which took place during the protests.

US President Donald Trump connected the protests with Mayor Kenney, saying that "the mayor or whoever it is that's allowing people to riot and loot and not stop them is... just a horrible thing" and stating that they took place in "a Democrat-run state, a Democrat-run city". Trump also claimed, "Philadelphia was torn up by Biden-supporting radicals", without providing evidence for the claim, adding, "Biden stands with the rioters, and I stand with the heroes of law enforcement." White House Director of Strategic Communications Alyssa Farah said on October 27 that the White House was "prepared to deploy federal resources" in response to the unrest. White House Press Secretary Kayleigh McEnany similarly suggested in a statement that the White House "stands ready, upon request, to deploy any and all federal resources to end these riots", calling them "the most recent consequence of the liberal Democrats' war against the police".

Biden responded to the protests by stating, "There is no excuse whatsoever for the looting and the violence. None whatsoever. I think to be able to protest is totally legitimate. It's totally reasonable."

== See also ==
- 2020–2021 United States racial unrest
- List of incidents of civil unrest in the United States
- 1985 MOVE bombing, another high-profile Philadelphia police-related incident that occurred a few blocks away in the same neighborhood 35 years earlier.
