= MOVE (Philadelphia organization) =

American Black separatist group

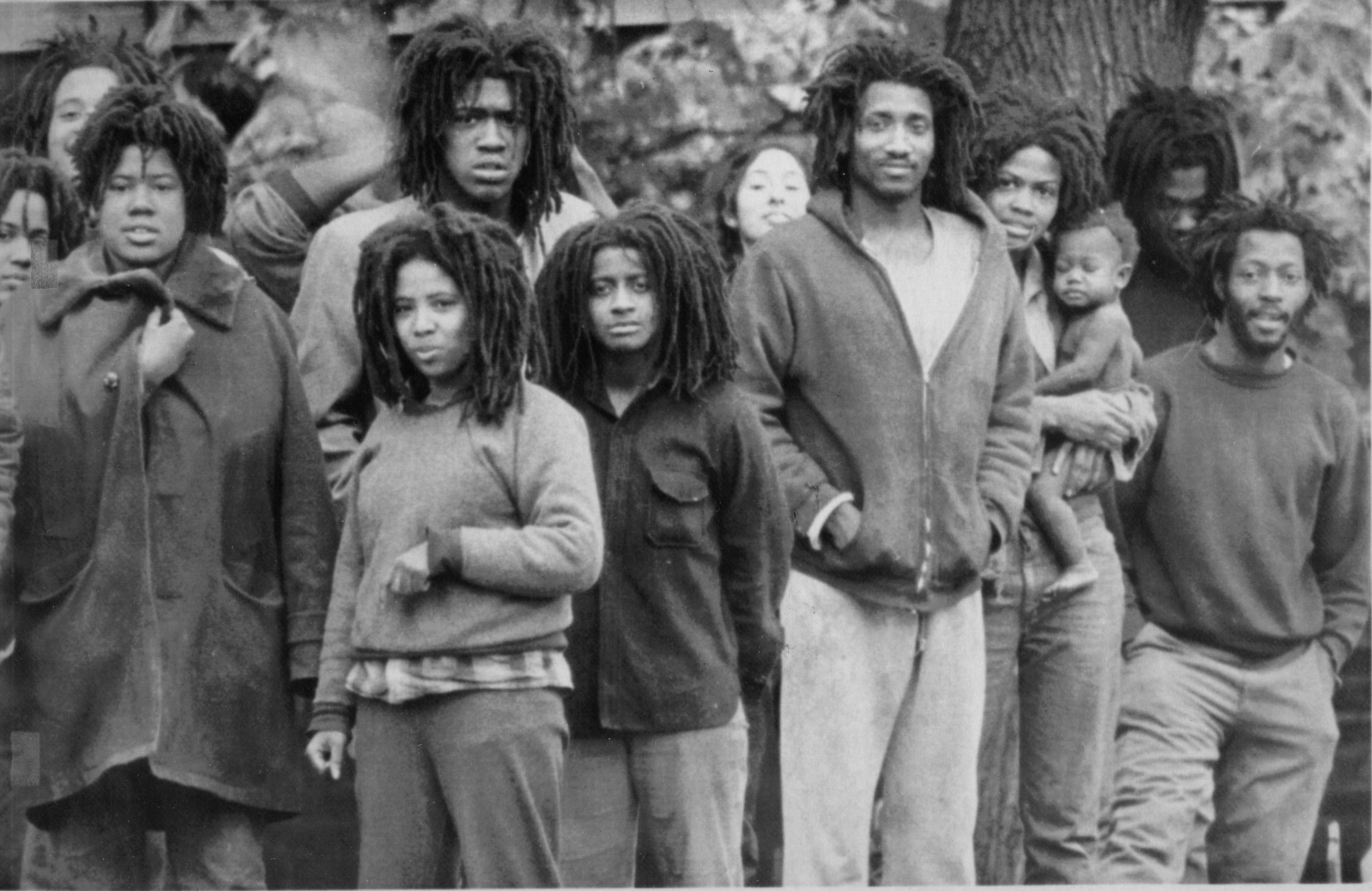
- Members of MOVE in 1978
- Leaders: John Africa; Ramona Africa (as Spokesperson)
- Founded: 1972; 54 years ago
- Country: United States
- Active regions: Philadelphia
- Ideology: Green anarchism; Black liberation; Black nationalism; Animal rights; Anarcho-primitivism; Deep ecology; Direct democracy; Environmentalism
- Political position: Far-left
- Status: Active
- Website: https://onamove.com/

MOVE, originally the Christian Movement for Life, is an organization that advocates for black liberation, nature laws and natural living, founded in 1972 in Philadelphia, Pennsylvania, United States, by John Africa (born Vincent Leaphart). MOVE lived in a communal setting in West Philadelphia, abiding by philosophies of anarcho-primitivism. The group combined revolutionary ideology, similar to that of the Black Panthers, with work for animal rights.

MOVE is particularly known for two major conflicts with the Philadelphia Police Department (PPD). In 1978, a standoff resulted in the death of police officer James J. Ramp and injuries to 16 officers and firefighters, as well as to members of the MOVE organization. Nine members were convicted of killing the officer and each received prison sentences of 30 to 100 years. In 1985, another firefight ended when a police helicopter dropped two bombs onto the roof of the MOVE compound, a townhouse located at 6221 Osage Avenue. The resulting fire killed six MOVE members and five of their children, and destroyed 65 houses in the neighborhood.

The police bombing was strongly condemned. The MOVE survivors later filed a civil suit against the City of Philadelphia and the PPD and were awarded $1.5 million in a 1996 settlement. Other residents displaced by the destruction of the bombing filed a civil suit against the city and in 2005 were awarded $12.83 million in damages in a jury trial.

== Origins ==
The group's name, MOVE, is not an acronym. Its founder, John Africa, chose this name to say what they intended to do. Members intend to be active because they say, "Everything that's alive moves. If it didn't, it would be stagnant, dead." When members greet each other they say "on the MOVE".

When the organization was founded in 1972, John Africa was functionally illiterate. He dictated his thoughts to Donald Glassey, a social worker from the University of Pennsylvania, and created what he called "The Guidelines" as the basis for his communal group. Africa and his mostly African-American followers wore their hair in dreadlocks, as popularized by Rastafari. MOVE advocated a radical form of green politics and a return to a hunter-gatherer society, while stating their opposition to science, medicine, and technology.

Members of MOVE identify as deeply religious and advocate for life. They believe that as all living beings are dependent, their lives should be treated as equally important. They advocate for justice that is not always based within institutions. MOVE members believe that for something to be just, it must be just for all living creatures. As John Africa had done, his followers changed their surnames to "Africa" to show reverence to what they regarded as their mother continent.

In a 2018 article about the group, Ed Pilkington of The Guardian described their political views as "a strange fusion of black power and flower power. The group that formed in the early 1970s melded the revolutionary ideology of the Black Panthers with the nature- and animal-loving communalism of 1960s hippies. You might characterise them as black liberationists-cum-eco warriors." He noted the group also functioned as an animal rights advocacy organization. Pilkington quoted member Janine Africa, who wrote to him from prison: "We demonstrated against puppy mills, zoos, circuses, any form of enslavement of animals. We demonstrated against Three Mile Island and industrial pollution. We demonstrated against police brutality. And we did so uncompromisingly. Slavery never ended, it was just disguised."

John Africa and his followers lived in a commune in a house owned by Glassey in the Powelton Village section of West Philadelphia. As activists, they staged demonstrations against institutions that they opposed, such as zoos, and speakers whose views they opposed. MOVE activities were scrutinized by law enforcement authorities, particularly under the administration of Mayor Frank Rizzo, a former police commissioner known for his hard line against activist groups.

In 1977, three MOVE members were jailed for inciting a riot, occasioning further tension, protests, and armed displays from the group.

=== 1978 shoot-out ===
In 1977, according to police accounts, the Philadelphia Police Department (PPD) obtained a court order for MOVE to vacate the Powelton Village property in response to a series of complaints made by neighbors. MOVE members agreed to vacate and surrender their weapons if the PPD released members of their group held in city jails.

Nearly a year later, on August 8, 1978, the PPD came to a standoff with members of MOVE who had not left the Powelton Village property. When police attempted to enter the house, a shootout ensued. PPD Officer James J. Ramp of the Stakeout Unit (now known as the S.W.A.T. Unit), was killed by a gunshot to the neck. Sixteen police officers and firefighters were also injured in the firefight. MOVE representatives claimed that Ramp was facing the house at the time and denied that the group was responsible for his death, insisting that he was killed by fire from fellow police officers. Prosecutors alleged that MOVE members fired the fatal shot and charged Debbie Sims Africa and eight other MOVE members with collective responsibility for his death.

According to a 2018 article in The Guardian

Eyewitnesses, however, gave accounts suggesting that the shot may have come from the opposite direction to the basement, raising the possibility that Ramp was accidentally felled by police fire. MOVE members continue to insist that they had no workable guns in their house at the time of the siege. Several months earlier, in May 1978, several guns – most of them inoperative – had been handed over to police at the MOVE house; however, prosecutors at the trial of the MOVE Nine told the jury that at the time of the August siege there had been functioning firearms in the house.

The standoff lasted about an hour before MOVE members began to surrender.

=== The MOVE 9 ===
The nine members of MOVE charged with third-degree murder for Ramp's death became known as the MOVE 9. Each was sentenced to a maximum of 100 years in prison. They were Chuck, Delbert, Eddie, Janet, Janine, Merle, Michael, Phil, and Debbie Sims Africa.

In 1998, at age 47, Merle Africa died in prison. Seven of the surviving eight members first became eligible for parole in the spring of 2008, but they were denied. Parole hearings for each of these prisoners were to be held yearly from that time. In 2015, at age 59, Phil Africa died in prison.

The first of the MOVE 9 to be released was Debbie Sims Africa on June 16, 2018. Debbie Sims Africa, who was 22 when sentenced, was released on parole and reunited with her 39-year-old son, Michael Davis Africa, Jr. She gave birth to him a month after she was imprisoned, and he was taken from her a week later. The release of Debbie Sims Africa renewed attention on members of MOVE and the Black Panthers who remain imprisoned in the U.S. from the period of the 1960s and 1970s. The Guardian journalist Ed Pilkington reported in June 2018 that there were at least 25 still in prison.

On October 23, 2018, Michael Davis Africa, the husband of Debbie Sims Africa, was released on parole. In May 2019, Janine and Janet Africa were released on parole after 41 years of imprisonment. On June 21, 2019, Eddie Goodman Africa was released on parole. Delbert Orr Africa was granted parole on December 20, 2019, and released January 18, 2020. The last of the MOVE 9 either to be paroled or to die behind bars was Chuck Sims Africa, who was released on parole on February 7, 2020, after 41 years of imprisonment. Both Delbert and Chuck died of cancer in 2020 and 2021, respectively.

== 1985 bombing ==
Location of the MOVE house, bombed in 1985 by the police, within Philadelphia

In 1981, MOVE relocated to a row house at 6221 Osage Avenue in the Cobbs Creek area of West Philadelphia. Neighbors complained to the city for years about trash around their building, confrontations with neighbors, and bullhorn announcements of sometimes obscene political messages by MOVE members. The bullhorn was broken and inoperable for the three weeks prior to the police bombing of the row house.

The police obtained arrest warrants in 1985 charging four MOVE occupants with crimes including parole violations, contempt of court, illegal possession of firearms, and making terrorist threats. Mayor Wilson Goode and police commissioner Gregore J. Sambor classified MOVE as a terrorist organization. Police evacuated residents of the area from the neighborhood prior to their action. Residents were told that they would be able to return to their homes after a 24-hour period.

On Monday, May 13, 1985, nearly five hundred police officers, along with city manager Leo Brooks, arrived in force and attempted to clear the building and execute the arrest warrants. Nearby houses were evacuated. Water and electricity were shut off in order to force MOVE members out of the house. Commissioner Sambor read a long speech addressed to MOVE members that started with, "Attention MOVE: This is America. You have to abide by the laws of the United States." When the MOVE members did not respond, the police decided to forcibly remove the 13 members from the house, which consisted of seven adults and six children.

There was an armed standoff with police, who lobbed tear gas canisters at the building. The MOVE members fired at them in return, and a 90-minute gunfight ensued, in which one officer was bruised in the back by gunfire. Police used more than ten thousand rounds of ammunition before Commissioner Sambor ordered that the compound be bombed. From a Pennsylvania State Police helicopter, Philadelphia Police Department Lt. Frank Powell proceeded to drop two one-pound bombs (which the police referred to as "entry devices") made of FBI-supplied Tovex, a dynamite substitute, targeting a cubicle on the roof of the house. The ensuing fire killed eleven of the people in the house (John Africa, five other adults, and five children aged 7 to 13). The fire spread and eventually destroyed approximately 65 nearby houses on Osage Avenue and nearby Pine Street. Although firefighters had earlier drenched the building prior to the bombing, after the fire broke out, officials said they feared that MOVE would shoot at the firefighters, so held them back.

Ramona Africa, one of the two MOVE survivors from the house, said that police fired at those trying to escape.

== Aftermath ==
Goode appointed an investigative commission called the Philadelphia Special Investigation Commission (PSIC, aka MOVE Commission), chaired by attorney William H. Brown, III. Sambor resigned in November 1985; in a speech the following year, he said that he was made a "surrogate" by Goode.

The MOVE Commission issued its report on March 6, 1986. The report denounced the actions of the city government, stating that "Dropping a bomb on an occupied row house was unconscionable." Following the release of the report, Goode made a formal public apology. No one from the city government was criminally charged in the attack. The only surviving adult MOVE member, Ramona Africa, was charged and convicted on charges of riot and conspiracy; she served seven years in prison.

In 1996 a federal jury ordered the city to pay a $1.5 million civil suit judgment to survivor Ramona Africa and relatives of two people killed in the bombing. The jury had found that the city used excessive force and violated the members' constitutional protections against unreasonable search and seizure. In 1985 Philadelphia was given the sobriquet "The City that Bombed Itself".

In 2005 federal judge Clarence Charles Newcomer presided over a civil trial brought by residents seeking damages for having been displaced by the widespread destruction following the 1985 police bombing of MOVE. A jury awarded them a $12.83 million verdict against the City of Philadelphia.

On November 12, 2020, the City Council of Philadelphia passed a resolution apologizing "for the decisions and events preceding and leading to the devastation that occurred on May 13, 1985." The council established "an annual day of observation, reflection and recommitment" to remember the MOVE Bombing.

In 2021, former members of MOVE came forward with allegations of abuse within the organization. As Jason Nark writes in The Philadelphia Inquirer, “More than a half-dozen ex-MOVE members have gone on the record in both the Murder at Ryan’s Run podcast and the blog (started by an ex-MOVE supporter) titled Leaving MOVE 2021, alleging physical and mental abuse in MOVE, a doctrine of homophobia and colorism, and what they describe as a manipulation of the public and the media under the banner of social justice."

=== 2002 shooting of John Gilbride ===
After John Africa's death, his widow, Alberta, married John Gilbride, Jr. Together they had a child, Zackary Africa, before divorcing in 1999. By 2002, Gilbride had no longer supported MOVE and resettled in Maple Shade, New Jersey. Alberta Africa was living in Cherry Hill, New Jersey, with their son, John Zachary Gilbride.

On September 10, 2002, in the course of their bitter custody dispute, Gilbride testified in court that MOVE had threatened to kill him. The court granted Gilbride partial custody of Zackary, allowing him unsupervised visits.

On September 27, shortly after midnight and prior to Gilbride's first visitation date with Zackary, an unknown assailant shot and killed him as he sat in a car parked outside his New Jersey apartment complex. Investigators did not name a suspect and the Burlington County Police did not release ballistics information.

The case remains unsolved. A MOVE spokeswoman initially said that the U.S. government had assassinated Gilbride in order to frame MOVE. His ex-wife Alberta Africa denied that the murder had occurred. She said in 2009 that Gilbride "is out hiding somewhere". Tony Allen, an ex-MOVE member, says that MOVE murdered Gilbride.

In 2012, The Philadelphia Inquirer reported that Gilbride had told friends and family that he had recorded incriminating evidence in a notebook as security against a "hit" by MOVE. Gilbride said he had placed the notebook inside a locker for safekeeping. The Burlington County Prosecutor's Office declined to follow up on the report.

=== Human remains ===
In April 2021, the Penn Museum and the University of Pennsylvania apologized to the Africa family for allowing human remains from the MOVE house to be used in research and training. In 1985, the Philadelphia City Medical Examiner's Office gave burned human remains found at the MOVE house to the University of Pennsylvania Museum of Archaeology and Anthropology for verification that the bones were those of 14-year-old Tree Africa and 12-year-old Delisha Africa. The remains were kept in a cardboard box in storage for decades and studied by Alan Mann, a professor at Penn and Janet Monge, the curator of the Penn Museum. The bones were used as part of an online forensic course as a case study. When Mann transferred to Princeton University in 2001, he reportedly took the remains with him.

Philadelphia Health Commissioner Thomas Farley resigned in May 2021 upon revelations that he ordered the cremation of a set of victims' remains without notifying or obtaining permission from the families of the deceased or even releasing the names of the deceased. The day after his resignation, the remains were recovered in a box labeled MOVE.

=== Other notable events ===
Ramona Africa acts as a spokesperson for the group. Mumia Abu-Jamal, a supporter of MOVE, was convicted and sentenced to death for the unrelated 1981 murder of police officer Daniel Faulkner. The death sentence was overturned in 2011 by a federal judge and Abu-Jamal was resentenced to life imprisonment without the possibility of parole. MOVE continues to advocate for Abu-Jamal's release.

Michael Moses Ward, known in MOVE as Birdie Africa, was the only child to survive the 1985 bombing. Ward was 13 years old at the time of the incident and suffered serious burns from the fire, which killed his mother. Ward's father, Andino Ward, sued the City of Philadelphia, and the parties reached a settlement. He lived with his father afterward and did not remain involved with MOVE. He died in 2013 in an accidental drowning.

In June 2020, MOVE member Delbert Africa died.

== Legacy ==
In August 1985, just a few months after the fire, Australian band Eurogliders released the song The City of Soul about the incident.

On the 25th anniversary of the 1985 bombing, The Philadelphia Inquirer published a detailed multimedia website containing retrospective articles, archived articles, videos, interviews, photos, and a timeline of the events.

John Edgar Wideman's 1990 novel Philadelphia Fire is based on the MOVE bombing.

Mischief Brew’s 2006 song "Save a City…" is about the MOVE bombing.

Philadelphia band Algernon Cadwallader's 2025 song "Attn: MOVE" is about the MOVE bombing and its political context.

=== Documentaries ===
The Bombing of Osage Avenue (1986) by author Toni Cade Bambara and Louis Massiah provides context for the bombing by using the history of the Cobbs Creek community. It focuses on the bombing's effects on community residents who did not belong to MOVE. The film also uses footage of the hearings of the MOVE commission. It premiered on WHYY-TV, Philadelphia's public broadcasting station.

Let the Fire Burn (2013) by producer/director Jason Osder about MOVE composed largely of archival footage.

Recorder: The Marion Stokes Project (2019) by Matt Wolf also featured footage of the group on the ABC news show Nightline.

40 Years a Prisoner (2020) by filmmaker Tommy Oliver chronicles the controversial 1978 Philadelphia police raid on MOVE and the aftermath that led to a Mike Africa Jr.'s decades-long fight to free his parents.

== See also ==
- David Shrager – American lawyer – trial lawyer who represented Michael Ward's father in a lawsuit against the city for injuries suffered in the fire
- Neo-Luddite – Philosophy opposing modern technology
- Partisan Defense Committee
