= How David Beats Goliath =

How David Beats Goliath: Access to Capital for Contingent-Fee Law Firms
- Author: Michael J. Swanson
- Language: English
- Publisher: Advantage Media Group
- Publication date: 2011
- Publication place: United States
- Media type: Print (Paperback)
- Pages: 139
- ISBN: 9781599322506

How David Beats Goliath: Access to Capital for Contingent-Fee Law Firms is a 2011 book by American businessman and financial expert, Michael J. Swanson. The book details the basic financial operation of contingent-fee law firms and outlines the methods used to secure funding for cases. All proceeds from the book are donated to the American Association for Justice's Seventh Amendment Fund, which is designed to help protect the right to a trial by jury.

== Summary ==
The book is split up into three sections: Background, Review of Capital Sources, and Application. The first section details basic operational practices that contingent-fee law firms employ. In this section, it notes that many contingent-fee law firms have to front money (or capital) for individual cases. The first section also discusses standard accounting and financial precepts (e.g. the time value of money and assets) that may not be traditionally covered in any law-based education.

The second section details 10 different sources of capital available for contingent-fee law firms. Each of these sources are listed in order from most to least expensive for the firm, and include the following:

- Fee Sharing
- Settlement Funding
- Partner's Cash
- Loans with Interest Pass-Through
- Contingent Lenders
- Finance Company Loans
- Vendor Financing
- Appeal Funding
- Credit Cards
- Bank Line of Credit

Each of these sources of capital has its own chapter in which it details the pros and cons. Swanson notes that many firms opt to self-finance either with partner's cash or credit cards. The book never explicitly points out which form of funding is best, noting that there are many variables that may make one source better than another. Swanson notes that, despite the wealth of options at their disposal, many contingent-fee law firms end up with a lackluster asset.

The third and final section of the book talks about how contingent-fee firms can utilize their capital more efficiently and get better deals from lenders and financing companies. It suggests that financially minded law firms will have a better chance of success than those that focus entirely on their cases.

== Reception ==
The book has been reviewed favorably in trade publications and online outlets. Most reviews have referred to the book's information as valuable for contingent-fee law firms and trial lawyers. Douglass F. Noland of TRIAL Magazine suggested that the book was "a must-read for any lawyer who works on contingent-fee cases," and that "if Swanson’s strategy is applied faithfully, lawyers may lessen their worries about financing their cases, so they can concentrate more on the cases themselves." Writing for Trial News, Morris H. Rosenberg noted that "an attorney needing to raise capital can get a quick overview of the sources available by reading this book."

Other reviews referenced the book's relative compactness and ease of reading. Jeffrey Isaac Ehrlich of Advocate Magazine referred to the book as "a fast-read" that succeeds in "helping lawyers think about the financial challenges they face, instead of just blindly doing what they have been doing." The book has received almost universal acclaim from trade publications. A review from RD Legal Funding noted that the book "does a great job explaining the purpose of legal funding" and "how it can ultimately help the broken model of finance for law firms."
