= John Africa =

American civil rights activist (1931–1985)

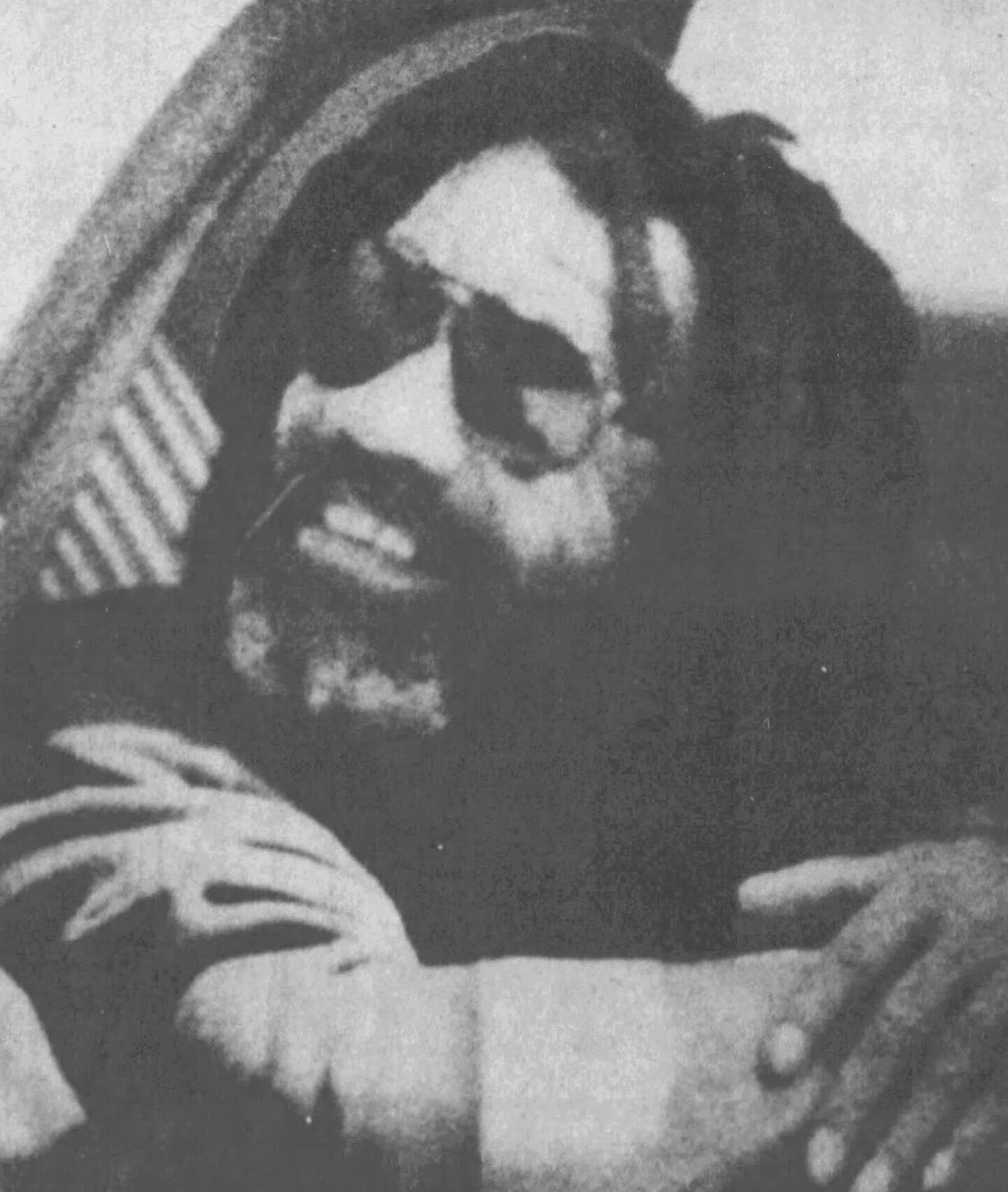
- Born: Vincent Leaphart; July 26, 1931; Philadelphia, Pennsylvania, U.S.
- Died: May 13, 1985 (aged 53); Philadelphia, Pennsylvania, U.S.
- Cause of death: Bombing
- Known for: Founder of MOVE

John Africa (born Vincent Leaphart; July 26, 1931 – May 13, 1985), was an American social activist who was the founder of MOVE, a Philadelphia-based, predominantly African American organization active since the early 1970s. He and his followers were killed in the residential home that served as MOVE's headquarters after the Philadelphia Police Department bombed the house with C4-explosive, igniting an uncontrolled and lethal fire following a standoff between MOVE and police.

== Life ==
=== Early life ===
John Africa was born Vincent Leaphart on July 26, 1931, in the Mantua neighborhood of West Philadelphia. His father, Frederick Leaphart, was a handyman, while his mother Lennie Mae was a homemaker. He was one of ten children. Lennie Mae died suddenly in her early 40s, and Africa would later blame the hospital for her death. As a child he was "painfully thin" and underweight. At age 9 he was transferred to a school for slow learners to learn simple trades. He would continue to struggle in school and dropped out at age 16.

Drafted by the US Army during the Korean War, Leaphart served over a year in an infantry unit. He later remarked on the contrast between the sunrise over the Korean mountains and the ugly gunfire of war. Upon his return he met Dorothy Clark and they were married shortly thereafter at the age of 29. She later described their marriage as ordinary, and friends described Leaphart as levelheaded and dependable while also noting that Dorothy helped him with his reading and writing.

=== Formation of MOVE ===
In 1971 he moved his family to the Powelton Village neighborhood of West Philadelphia, close to the University of Pennsylvania. Community Housing Inc. was a cooperative in which members pooled money together to buy a handful of buildings. Although the area had a large majority of academic residents, Leaphart was seen as eccentric yet tolerable as the area was diverse. Faced with foreclosure, the co-op stepped in and purchased his home so he could remain living there. In 1972, Leaphart changed his name to John Africa to represent the continent where life began.

Africa attracted people in Philadelphia area who followed his teachings. He later met Donald Glassey, a social worker from the University of Pennsylvania, who was so intrigued by Africa's teachings that he volunteered to write and compile the illiterate Africa's thoughts into a book. Glassey's notes were eventually the basis of a document called "The Guidelines". With Glassey, Africa moved his new organization to a house on Pearl Street in West Philadelphia. After parting ways with Glassey due to differing views, Africa made "The Guidelines" the primary source for his teachings and the principles of MOVE, founded in 1972 as the Christian Movement for Life. "The Guidelines" articulated teachings such as strict vegetarianism and the inherent value of all living things.

MOVE accepted members regardless of their past and taught lessons on corruption, racism, and the need for individuality in an increasingly technological society. Further, the organization protested animal cruelty in zoos, the education system, and police brutality. Consequently, the police engaged in heavy surveillance around members of MOVE. According to the 2013 documentary film Let the Fire Burn, a member of the Philadelphia police revealed that between 1972 and 1978, 193 arrests of MOVE members and 93 subsequent court cases occurred.

On August 8, 1978, the Philadelphia police attempted to evict the MOVE organization from their home on Pearl Street. A standoff occurred, resulting in an eventual shootout, and the death of one police officer, James J. Ramp, as well as several injuries. Nine MOVE members were arrested and the organization was removed from their home. The home was immediately demolished and the "MOVE 9" were convicted over the police officer's death. Merle Africa and Phil Africa died in the Pennsylvania prison system. The last remaining members were released in February 2020.

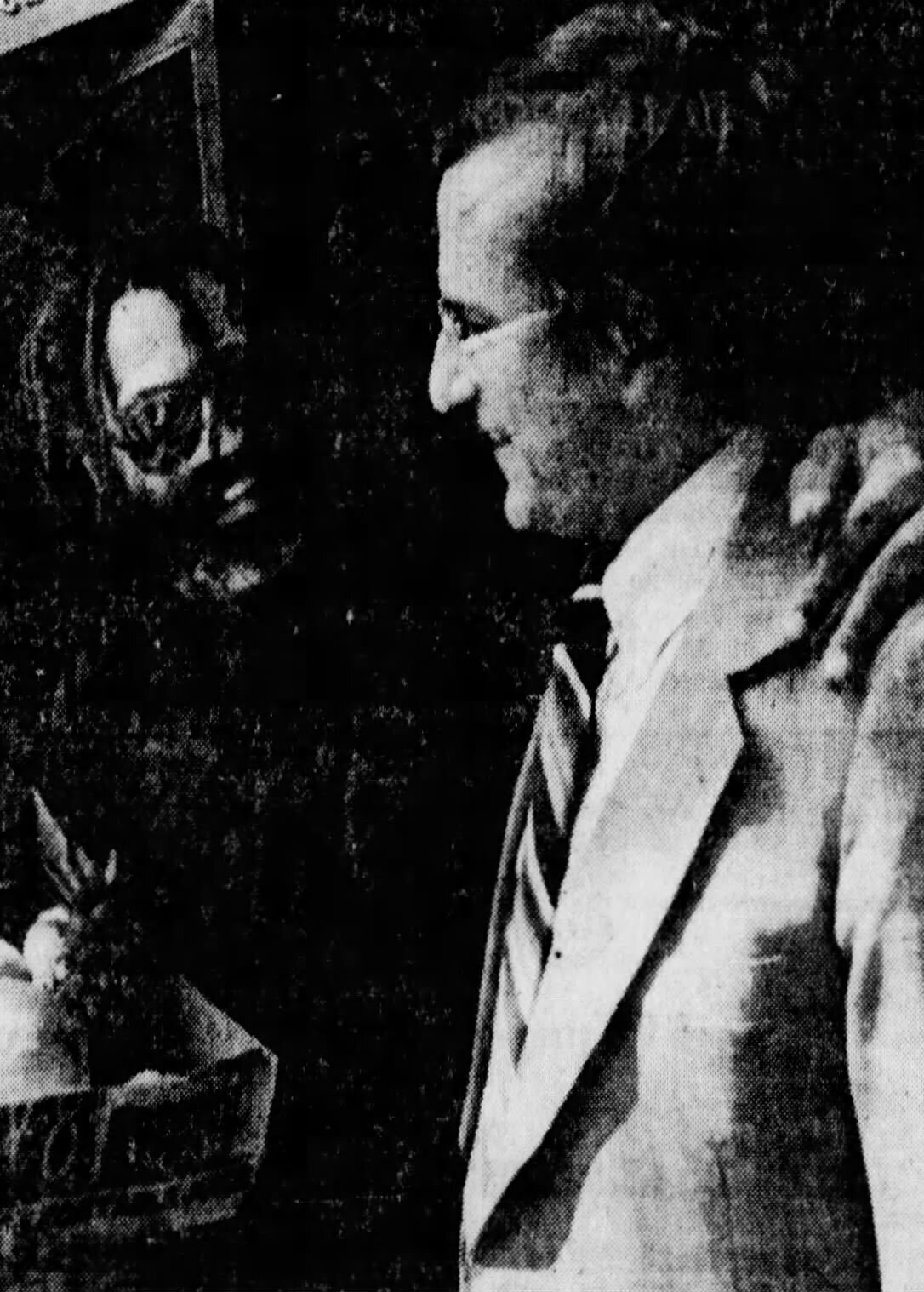
Africa hugging his attorney Jack Snite outside the James A. Byrne United States Courthouse after being acquitted of weapons and conspiracy charges, July 22, 1981

Glassey, after being found in possession of weapons, was later arrested. He implicated Africa and other MOVE members in various crimes. On July 23, 1981, in a Philadelphia federal court, Africa and his co-defendant Alfonso Africa (representing themselves) were tried and acquitted on weapons and conspiracy charges by a jury that deliberated for almost six days.

=== Death ===
After the Powelton Village standoff, Africa and MOVE relocated to a house on Osage Avenue in the Cobbs Creek neighborhood of West Philadelphia. Law enforcement officials obtained permission from the Mayor's office to evict members of MOVE due to neighborhood complaints of obscenity and arrest warrants. On May 13, 1985, they attempted to evict MOVE and execute arrest warrants. Non-compliance by MOVE developed into an armed standoff and firefight.

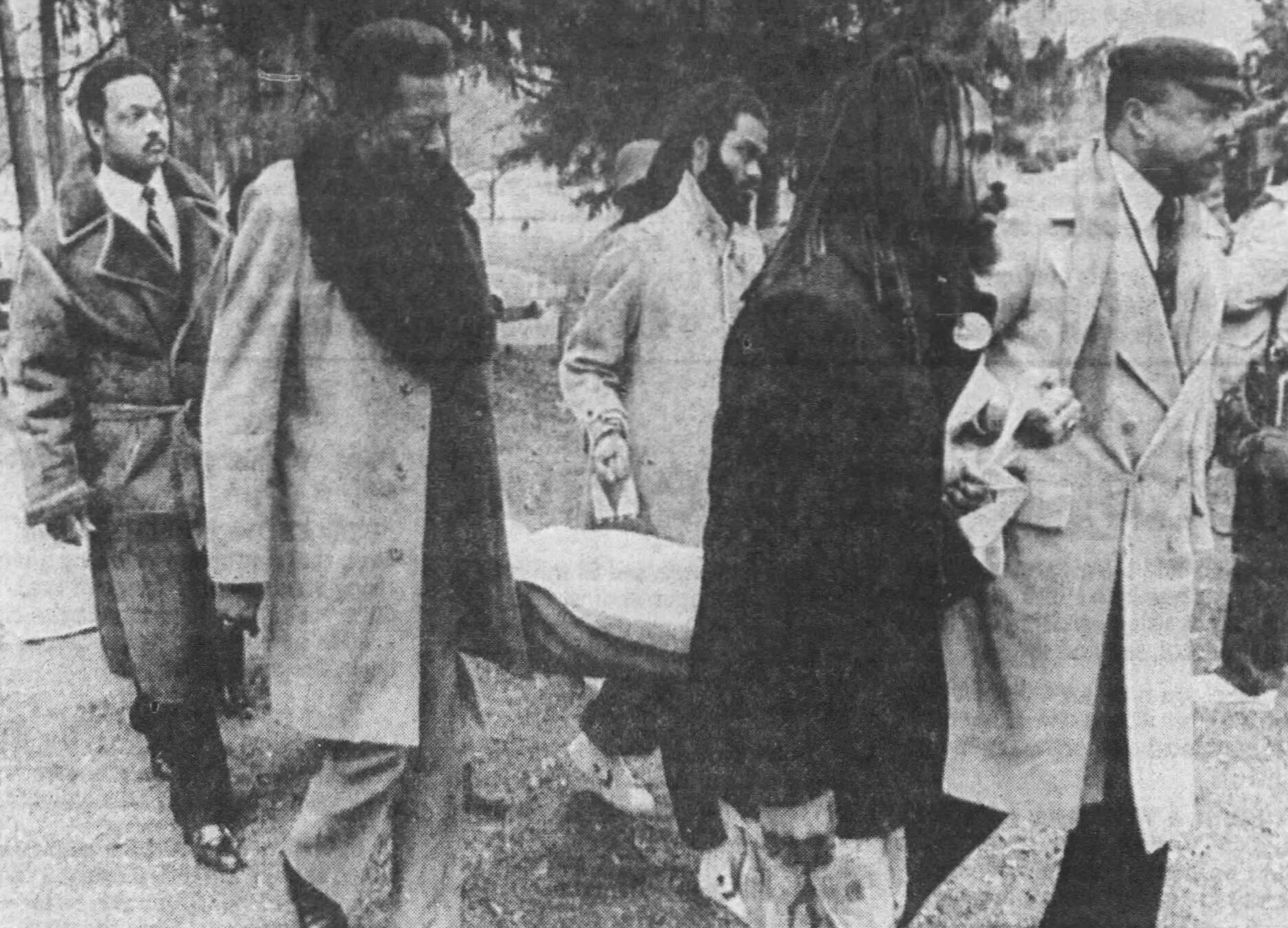
Jesse Jackson (far left) and other pallbearers carrying the remains of Africa

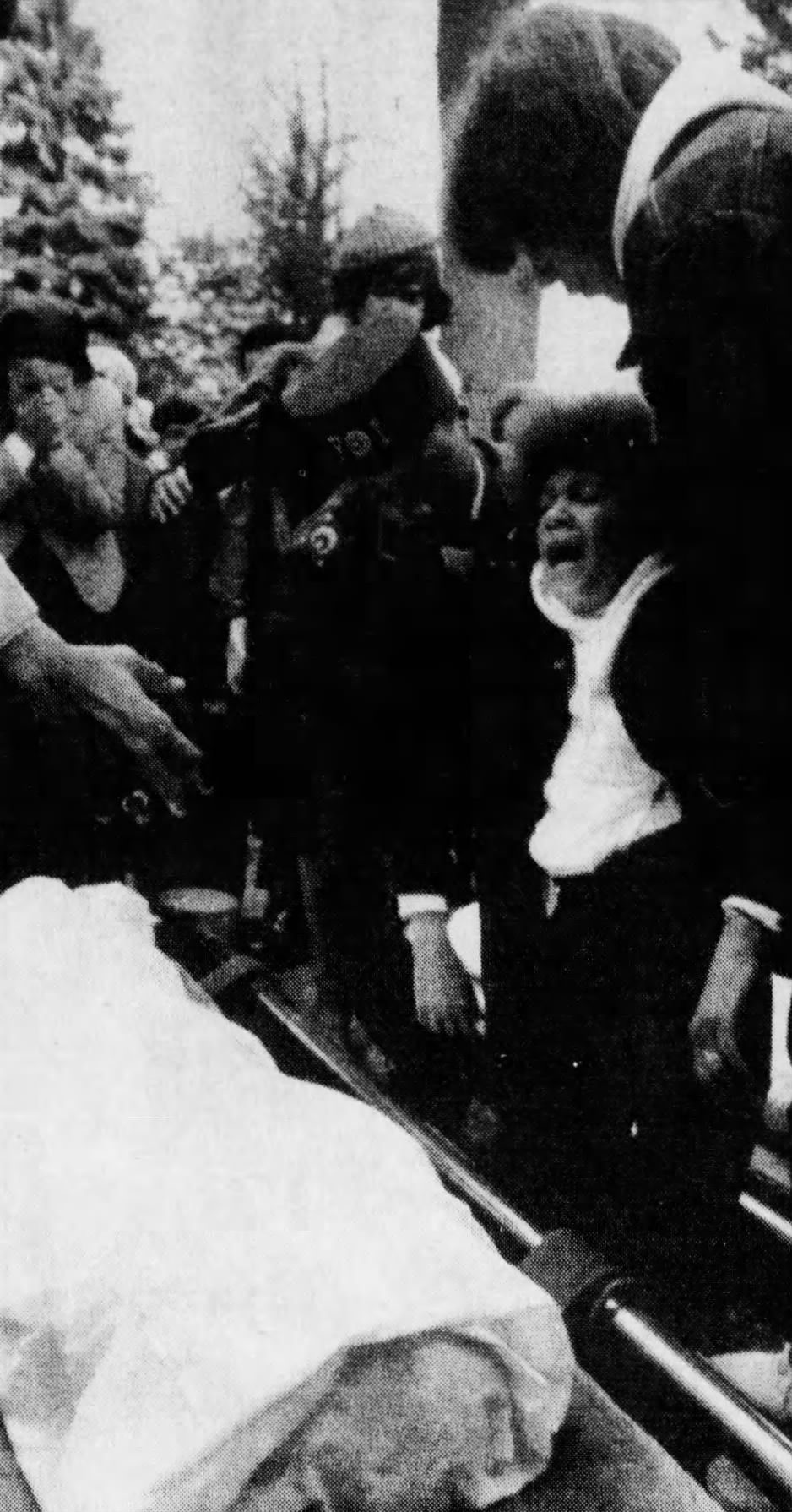
Africa's sister Louise James being helped away from a cloth-covered board containing his remains

Eleven MOVE members, including John Africa, five other adults, and five children died in the resulting fire from the Philadelphia Police bombing the home. Although the members were all huddled in the basement with access to a back alley, the alley was under police gunfire. Ramona Africa, the lone surviving adult, described bullets flying all around during her first escape attempt, and Birdie Africa, the lone surviving child, described hearing automatic gunfire when they tried to flee from the fire. Police officers at the scene denied these claims. Sole survivors Ramona and Birdie both suffered severe burns. Birdie was released but Ramona was convicted and sentenced to serve the maximum sentence of seven years in prison, all of which she served. Despite the Philadelphia Police and Fire Departments being found guilty of negligence by the Philadelphia Special Investigation Commission, no criminal charges were ever filed against any of the perpetrators of the bombing, arson, and resulting deaths.

== Teachings ==
John Africa's philosophy has been classified as anarcho-primitivist. His teachings emphasized the importance of all life and how capitalism, war, racism, and other social forces serve as direct opposition to this reality. He encouraged strict vegetarianism, a diet of raw food, and communal living. According to MOVE's website, "John Africa despises prejudice, despised the man-made standard of inferior-superior," and "John Africa teach MOVE people to believe in and love life, to understand the absolute necessity of life and protect all life equally, meaning all living beings (people, animals, water, soil, air)".

== Influence on others ==
Philadelphia activist and convicted murderer Mumia Abu-Jamal has followed the teachings of John Africa, and was a supporter of the MOVE organization.

== See also ==
- Black nationalism
- Development criticism
