= Museum of Black Joy =

- Established: January 1, 2020
- Location: Philadelphia, Pennsylvania
- Type: Digital/Virtual Museum
- Website: www.museumofblackjoy.com

The Museum of Black Joy is a virtual museum launched by Philadelphia artist Andrea "Philly" Walls on January 1, 2020. The museum's mission statement says that it exists "To celebrate, cultivate, commemorate, & circulate stories that center Black joy." The museum includes photography, videos, poems, and other visuals meant to celebrate the African-American experience.

== Background ==
=== Museum ===
Walls opted for a virtual museum as opposed to an in-person experience to make her art more accessible. She stated that not everyone can visit an in-person museum for various personal reasons and didn't want anyone to miss out on experiencing her art. This digital museum began as a blog run by Walls in January 2020 where she would upload photographs of scenes from Philadelphia daily. When the COVID-19 pandemic hit, she was unable to continue photographing as frequently as she used to, but continued working on what would become the digital museum. Walls choose Black joy as the focus for the digital museum to counteract how the Black experience is portrayed in the media. She told The Philadelphia Inquirer that she "was really looking for a way to make art that doesn’t ignore" the "live-action murders" Black individuals face but wanted to do so without "a very traumatizing visual narrative." Walls describes Black joy as "a very particular and specific salvation. It’s for me about endurance, possibility, creativity, grace, and a supreme kindness."

Since Walls and the museum were featured in The Philadelphia Inquirer on July 25, 2021, traffic to the site increased "almost 2000%" according to an interview she did with NPR.

=== Creator/curator ===
==== Early life and career ====
Andrea Walls is a 57-year-old poet, photographer, and Philadelphia native. Before creating the digital experience, she was a Pushcart Prize-nominated poet. After studying photography for 2 years, she began blogging photos of everyday activities concerning African-Americans outside her house in West Philadelphia. Walls grew up in Cobbs Creek, West Philadelphia, and many of her first blogged photographs were of images that evoked memories of her own childhood, such as kids playing in the streets, adults socializing in a park, and patrons at restaurants. Walls hoped to be able to document Black life before the effects of gentrification disallowed her from doing so. In the past, she has worked with organizations such as the Writers Room at Drexel University and the Studio Museum in Harlem. Her work has been supported by organizations such as the Colored Girls Museum, the Studio Museum in Harlem, the Women's Mobile Museum, the Eastern State Penitentiary, and Mural Arts Philadelphia.

In October 2021, Walls was chosen as the recipient of the MIT & Black Public Media Visiting Arts Program hosted by MIT's OpenDocLab. As an OpenDocLab fellow, Walls planned to present a final project in April 2022 at the PitchBLACK event. Walls and alternate recipient Ngardy Conteh George have received $7,500 in funding for their projects and to participate in the fellowship.

Walls has listed artists from the Harlem Renaissance and Black Arts Movements as among those who have inspired her work.

== Public reception ==
Since its creation, both the museum and Walls have been featured in several journalism websites and social media accounts online.

=== Interviews ===
- Philadelphia Inquirer: On July 25, 2021, the Inquirer published an interview with Walls detailing her reasoning behind creating the museum as well as featuring several of her photography pieces such as 'Learning the Ropes: A Rite of Passage' and 'On the Good Foot: Or Pulling Ourselves up by Our Pom Poms.'
- FOX 29 Philadelphia: On August 1, 2021, FOX 29 news conducted a live interview with Walls showcasing several images and digital art pieces from the museum.
- BNC News: In a YouTube interview with Marc Lamont Hill from BNC News on August 6, 2021, Andrea Walls discussed the inspirations behind the museum and how she curated each of the pieces showcased on the website. In the interview, Hill describes the museum as a "choice to look for magnificence in the everyday."
- NPR: On August 14, 2021, NPR interviewed Walls and featured her pieces, 'Election Day at Granahan Playground & Skate Park,' 'Ramona! A Celebration of Life,' 'Ready, Set, Prance,' and 'Quench' in their article.

=== Other articles ===
- Walls and the Museum of Black Joy were also featured in Because of Them We Can, Technically, and Black Enterprise from August to November 2021. On August 24, 2021, Black Enterprise called the museum a "healing and powerful perspective of the Black experience" and wrote that "during the dark days of the pandemic and the constant images and stories of racial injustice, The Museum of Black Joy became a source of healing."
