= Shrager =

Shrager is a surname. Notable people with the surname include:

- David Shrager (1935–2005), American lawyer
- Mordechai Shrager, Israeli footballer
- Rosemary Shrager (born 1951), English chef and TV presenter
