= 1985 MOVE bombing =

1985 aerial bombing by police in Philadelphia

- Part of Black Power movement and political violence in the United States during the Cold War
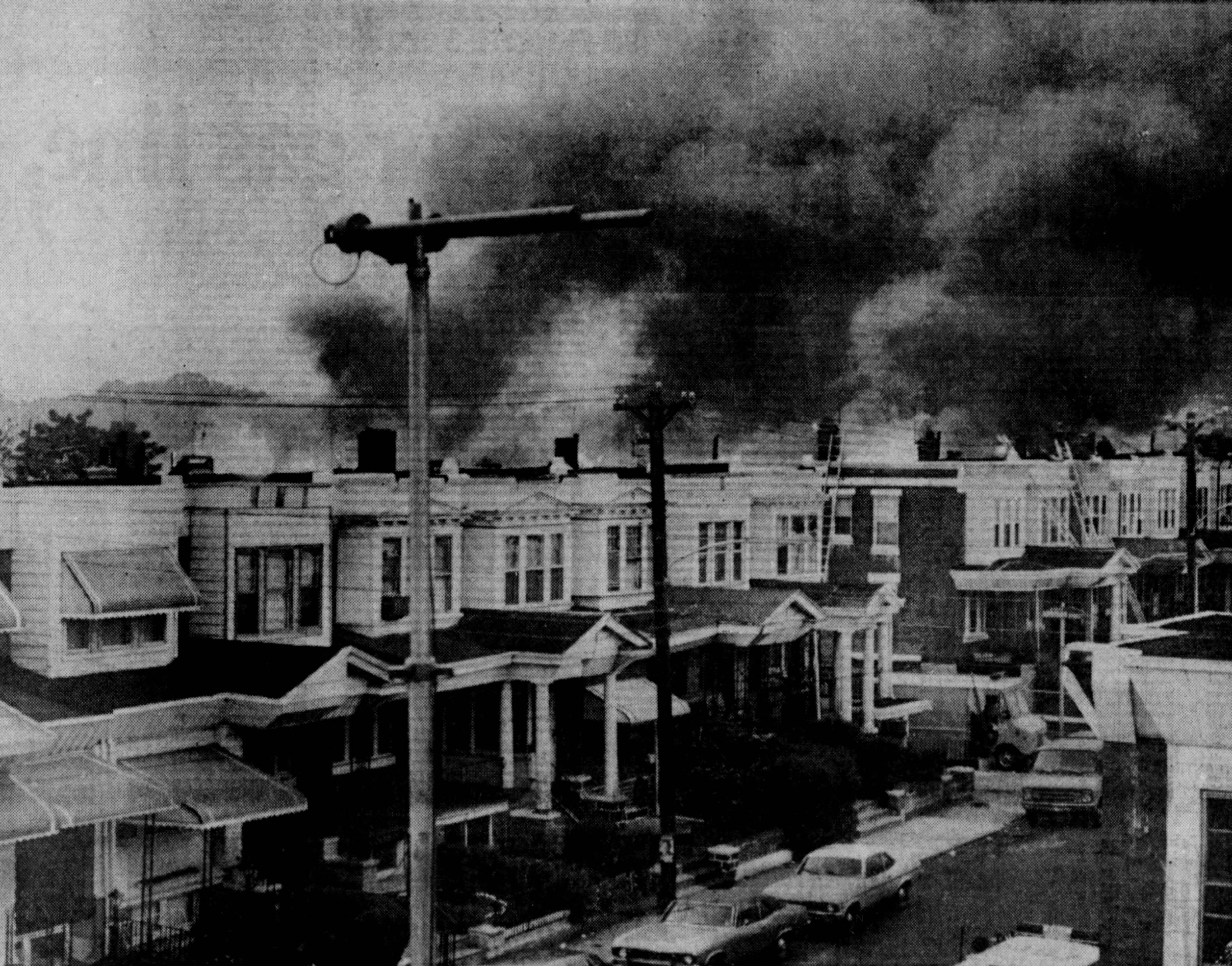
- Smoke rises above homes in Philadelphia after the bombing
- Date: May 13, 1985; 41 years ago
- Location: 6221 Osage Ave, Philadelphia, Pennsylvania, U.S. 39°57′20.52″N 75°14′48.84″W
- Caused by: Conflict between MOVE members and Philadelphia Police Department officers regarding arrest warrants
- Methods: Aerial bombing with Tovex and C-4

Parties
MOVE	Philadelphia Police Department

Lead figures
John Africa	Wilson Goode; Gregore J. Sambor; Leo Brooks

Number
7 adults 6 children	~500 police officers

Casualties and losses
6 adults and 5 children killed Surviving adult arrested, charged and convicted of riot and conspiracy 1 home destroyed	1 police officer lightly injured
- 61 neighboring homes destroyed 250 bystanders made homeless
- City of Philadelphia found to have violated Fourth Amendment rights and used excessive force in 1996; found liable for damages to bystanders' homes in 2005.

The 1985 MOVE bombing, locally known by its date, May 13, 1985, was the aerial bombing of a house, and the destruction of 61 more houses by the subsequent fire, in the Cobbs Creek neighborhood of Philadelphia, Pennsylvania, United States, by the Philadelphia Police Department during an armed battle with MOVE, a black liberation organization. MOVE members shot at Philadelphia police who had come to evict them from the house they were using as their headquarters. Philadelphia police aviators then dropped two explosive devices from a Pennsylvania State Police helicopter onto the roof of the house, which was occupied at the time. For 90 minutes, the Philadelphia Police Department allowed the resulting fire to burn out of control, destroying 61 previously evacuated neighboring houses over two city blocks and leaving 250 people homeless. Six adults and five children were killed in the attack; two occupants of the house, one adult and one child, survived. A lawsuit in federal court found that the city used excessive force and violated constitutional protections against unreasonable search and seizure.

== Background ==
In 1981, MOVE relocated to a row house at 6221 Osage Avenue in the Cobbs Creek area of West Philadelphia. Neighbors complained to the city for years about trash around their building, confrontations with neighbors, and bullhorn announcements of political messages by MOVE members.

The police obtained arrest warrants in 1985 charging four MOVE occupants with crimes including parole violations, contempt of court, illegal possession of firearms, and making terroristic threats. Mayor Wilson Goode and police commissioner Gregore J. Sambor classified MOVE as a terrorist organization. Police evacuated residents of the area from the neighborhood prior to their action. Residents were told that they would be able to return after 24 hours.

== Incident ==
On Monday, May 13, 1985, nearly 500 police officers, along with city manager Leo Brooks, arrived in force and attempted to clear the building and execute the arrest warrants. Water and electricity were shut off to try to force MOVE members out of the house. At 5:35 a.m., Sambor read a long speech addressed to MOVE members that started with, "Attention MOVE: This is America. You have to abide by the laws of the United States." They were given 15 minutes to come out. When the MOVE members did not respond, the police decided to forcibly remove everyone who was in the house. Inside the building were seven adults and six children.

An armed battle ensued. Police threw tear gas canisters at the building. The MOVE members fired at them, and a gunfight with semi-automatic and automatic firearms went on for 90 minutes. One officer's flak jacket was hit in the back, but he was not seriously hurt. Police used more than 10,000 rounds of ammunition. At 2 p.m., Sambor ordered that the compound be bombed.

From a Pennsylvania State Police helicopter, Philadelphia Police Department Lt. Frank Powell proceeded to drop two 1.5-pound (0.75 kg) bombs (which the police referred to as "entry devices") made of Tovex, a dynamite substitute, combined with two pounds of FBI-supplied C-4, targeting a fortified, bunker-like cubicle on the roof of the house. The bombs exploded after 45 seconds, igniting the fuel of a gasoline-powered generator and setting the house on fire, which was left to burn. Officials later stated that this was to let the fire burn through the roof and destroy the "bunker", so police could then drop tear gas into the house and flush out the occupants. Thirty minutes later, firefighters moved in to control the fire, but there was gunfire and the firefighters and police were ordered back as the fire spread to neighboring houses down the street. The only two MOVE survivors, Birdie Africa, who was 13 at the time, and Ramona Africa, both escaped the house. Police initially said that two men had also run out of the house at the same time and fired at them and that police had returned fire. Ramona Africa said that police fired at those trying to escape. Police said that MOVE members moved in and out of the house shooting at the police. The fire department declared the fire under control at 11:47 p.m.

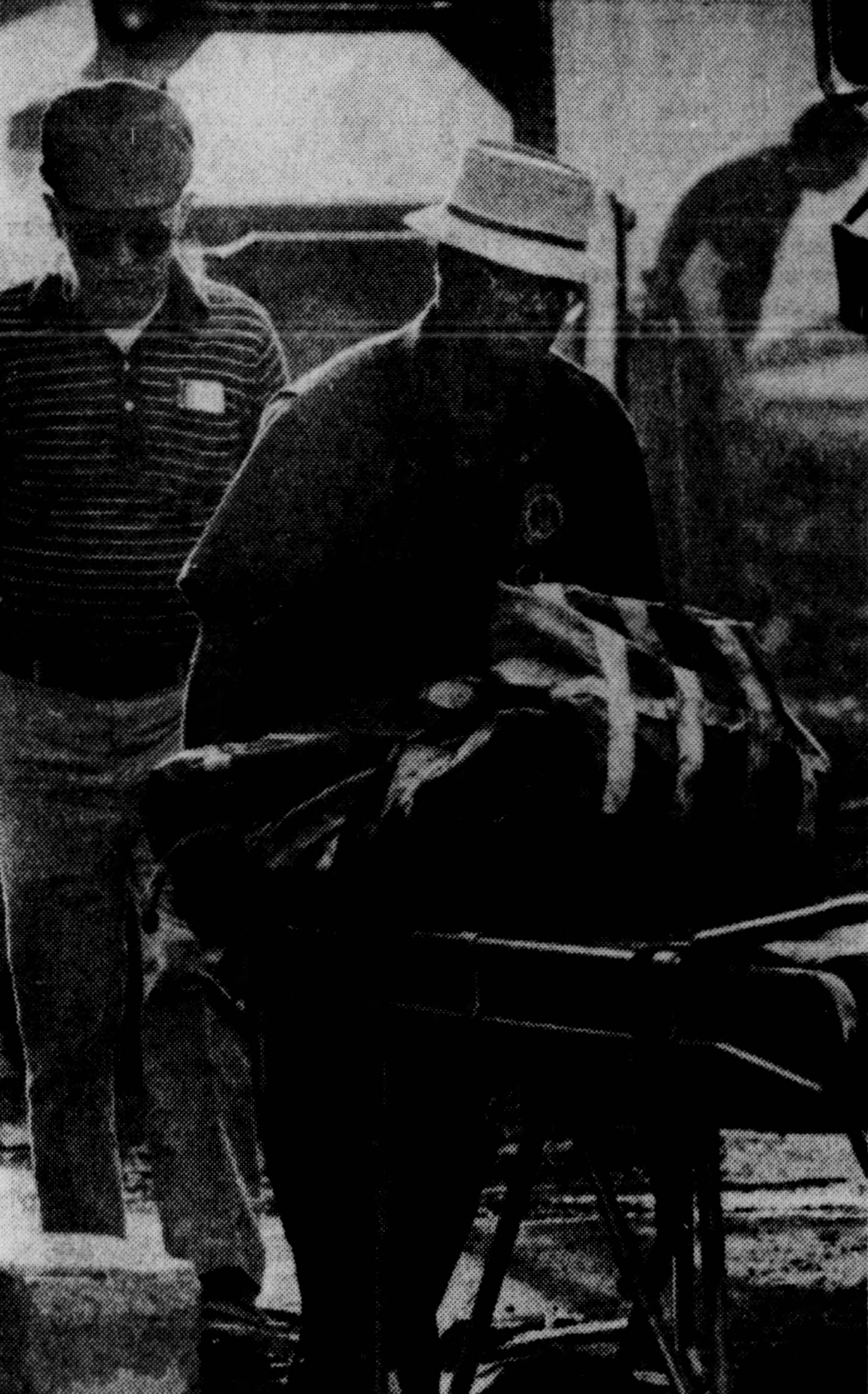
Police and medical authorities remove a body from MOVE headquarters on May 14

The fire killed 11 of the people in the house, six adults and five children: John Africa, Rhonda Africa, Theresa Africa, Frank Africa, Conrad Africa, Tree Africa, Delisha Africa, Netta Africa, Little Phil Africa, Tomaso Africa, and Raymond Africa. Sixty-one neighboring houses were destroyed by the fire, leaving 250 people homeless.

== Aftermath ==
Mayor Goode appointed an investigative commission called the Philadelphia Special Investigation Commission (PSIC, which became known as the MOVE Commission), chaired by William H. Brown III. Commissioner Sambor resigned in November 1985; in a speech the following year, he said that he was made a "surrogate" by Goode.

In 1986, Ellen Powell Tiberino and her husband Joseph created a seven-foot relief sculpture called The MOVE Confrontation as their interpretation of the bombing. It depicted people engulfed in flames, Mayor Goode, a death mask and horrified spectators. It created controversy in the city and produced headlines across the country.

The MOVE Commission issued its report on March 6, 1986. The report denounced the actions of the city government, stating that dropping a bomb on an occupied row house was unconscionable. Following the release of the report, Goode made a formal public apology. No one from the city government was criminally charged in the attack. The only surviving adult MOVE member, Ramona Africa, refused to testify in court and was charged and convicted on charges of riot and conspiracy; she served seven years in prison.

A lawsuit appealing a judgment against the police and public officials was filed with the United States Court of Appeals for the Third Circuit on November 3, 1994, Africa v. City of Philadelphia (In re City of Philadelphia Litig.), 49 F.3d 945 (1995), and was decided on March 6, 1995. The court decided that the plaintiffs did not have a Fourth Amendment claim against the city because there was no seizure when the defendants dropped explosives on the plaintiffs' buildings, and that city officials and police officers had qualified immunity under 42 U.S.C.S. § 1983, but that the city was not immune from liability despite its officials being exempt as individuals.

In 1996, a federal jury ordered the city to pay a $1.5 million civil suit judgment to survivor Ramona Africa and relatives of two people killed in the bombing. The jury had found that the city used excessive force and violated the members' constitutional protections against unreasonable search and seizure. Ramona was awarded $500,000 for the pain, suffering and physical harm suffered in the fire.

In 2005, federal judge Clarence Charles Newcomer presided over a civil trial brought by residents seeking damages for having been displaced by the widespread destruction following the 1985 police bombing of MOVE. A jury decided that the City of Philadelphia should pay them $12.83 million.

In 2013, the documentary film Let the Fire Burn introduced the history of the MOVE bombing to a wider audience.

The opera We Shall Not Be Moved (2017), with music by Daniel Bernard Roumain, lyrics by Marc Bamuthi Joseph and choreography by Bill T. Jones, reflects on the tragedy.

In November 2020, the Philadelphia City Council approved a resolution to formally apologize for the MOVE bombing. On May 8, 2025, the Philadelphia City Council approved a resolution declaring May 13 as "a day of reflection and remembrance" in honor of the victims.

=== Block redevelopment ===
By late fall 1985, the city government and a private developer had begun to rebuild the residential block that the police department damaged with the MOVE bombing. However, the homeowners who moved back in found the construction to be of poor quality, and in 1995, the Ed Rendell administration summoned the United States Army Corps of Engineers to inspect the buildings; they found the 61 buildings were not up to code. The city government attempted to remedy this, but by 2005, the city gave up trying to improve the defects and offered $150,000 to any resident who would agree to leave; over two-thirds accepted the deal and abandoned their houses. In 2016, the city government committed to rebuilding the block again; in January 2023, Mike Africa Jr., who is a member of MOVE and great-nephew of John Africa, bought the house at 6221 Osage Avenue with plans to turn part of it into a memorial.

== Use of human remains from the bombings ==
Since the bombing, the bones of two children, 14-year-old Tree (Katricia Dotson) and 12-year-old Delisha Orr Africa, were kept at the University of Pennsylvania Museum of Archaeology and Anthropology. In 2021, Billy Penn revealed that according to the museum, the remains had been transferred to researchers at Princeton University, though the university was unaware of their exact whereabouts. The remains had been used by Janet Monge, an adjunct professor in anthropology at the University of Pennsylvania and a visiting professor in the same subject at Princeton University, in videos for an online forensics course named "Real Bones: Adventures in Forensic Anthropology," as case studies. Present-day MOVE members were shocked to learn this, with Mike Africa Jr. stating, "They were bombed, and burned alive ... and now you wanna keep their bones."

The city stated the remains had gone unclaimed by the families after the bombing, but in May 2021, the city of Philadelphia's Health Commissioner, Thomas Farley, resigned under pressure after it was revealed that, in 2017, he ordered the cremation and disposal of victims' remains without either identifying them or contacting members of the family. A day after Farley's resignation, staff at the Medical Examiner's Office found the box labeled "MOVE" in a refrigerated area of their office containing the un-cremated remains. As of 2021, Mike Africa Jr. stated that the Africa family have not yet decided what to do with the remains. The sisters' remains from the Medical Examiner's Office were released to their surviving brother in August 2022.

Although the bones used by Monge in the "Real Bones" course were given to the Africa family in 2021, accounts differ regarding how many remains were at the University of Pennsylvania Museum of Archaeology and Anthropology and whether all bones from MOVE bombing victims at the museum were returned in 2021. A legal team hired by the University of Pennsylvania stated that the bones of Delisha Orr were never at the Penn Museum. However, an investigation by the City of Philadelphia disagreed, and stated that there was evidence that remains of Delisha Orr were at the Penn Museum. Nine forensic anthropologists certified by the American Board of Forensic Anthropology disagreed with the claims published by Penn's legal team and agreed with those of the City of Philadelphia. The City of Philadelphia also questioned whether all the remains of Katricia Dotson which were at the Penn Museum were given to MOVE in 2021.

In November 2024, further remains were found at the University of Pennsylvania. They were thought to belong to Delisha Africa.

== See also ==
- Lists of killings by law enforcement officers in the United States
- Miracle Valley shootout
- Rainbow Farm
- Ruby Ridge
- Waco siege
