= Let the Fire Burn =

- Theatrical release poster
- Directed by: Jason Osder
- Produced by: Jason Osder; Andrew Herwitz
- Edited by: Nels Bangerter
- Music by: Chris Mangum
- Production company: George Washington University
- Distributed by: Zeitgeist Films (USA)
- Release date: October 2, 2013
- Running time: 95 minutes
- Country: United States
- Language: English

Let the Fire Burn is a 2013 documentary film about the events leading up to and surrounding the 1985 MOVE bombing, at the culmination of a 1985 stand-off between the black liberation group MOVE and the Philadelphia Police Department. The film is directed and produced by Jason Osder and was released by Zeitgeist Films in October 2013.

== Synopsis ==
The MOVE organization was originally established as a "back-to-nature" movement that practiced "green" methods. In 1985, the Philadelphia Police Department decided to take action to evict the group from their row house at 6221 Osage Avenue. When gunfire broke out and tear gas was not enough to pull the MOVE members out of the house, the police decided to drop explosives on the house.

A fire soon began to blaze, endangering the several children now trapped inside the house. In a controversial decision, the police opted to "let the fire burn", resulting in the destruction of over 60 homes and the death of five children and six adults. Officials said they feared that MOVE would shoot at the firefighters.

== Aftermath ==
Eleven people (MOVE founder John Africa, five other adults, and five children aged 7 to 13) died in the resulting fire, and more than 250 people in the neighborhood were left homeless. Ramona Africa, one of the two survivors, said that police fired at those trying to escape. The investigation commission that followed found that city leaders and law enforcement had acted negligently, but no criminal charges were filed.

== Awards ==
- 2013: Tribeca Film Festival, Official Selection. Award for Best Editing in a Documentary, Best New Documentary Filmmaker – special jury mention.
- 2013: Hot Docs Canadian International Documentary Festival, Official Selection
- 2013: Philadelphia Film Festival, Jury Award for Best Local Feature
- 2013: Antenna, Australia's International Documentary Festival, Best International Documentary Film
- 2013: Gotham Awards, nominated for Best Documentary Feature
- 2013: International Documentary Association Awards, nominated for Best Feature and Best Editing
- 2013: Independent Spirit Awards, nominated for 19th Annual Stella Artois Truer Than Fiction Award
- 2013: Cinema Eye Honors, nominated for Debut Feature Film and Best Editing

== Reception ==
Following its world premiere at the 2013 Tribeca Film Festival, the film received positive reviews and had been a critical success throughout its theatrical run. Review aggregator Rotten Tomatoes, reports positive reviews with a 97% rating, and a consensus stating that the film is "Smartly edited and heartbreakingly compelling".

"So I'll get right to it – the only truly great film I've seen at this year's Tribeca Film Festival is Jason Osder's searing Let the Fire Burn... It goes without saying that this masterpiece about an astounding and forgotten moment in recent American history should be seen far and wide; every American is an ambitious goal, so as many as possible will do. But let's just start with you, anonymous reader, and we'll go from there." -Brandon Harris, Filmmaker Magazine

"Critic's pick...Ranking with recent found-footage efforts like The Autobiography of Nicolae Ceausescu and Senna, yet joining a still longer lineage, Let the Fire Burn relentlessly sustains its tragic momentum." -Nicolas Rapold, The New York Times

"The doc's focus on period material confers an in-the-moment feel to the final product, bringing urgency to a story many in the audience will never have heard but which remains relevant after almost three decades." -John DeFore, The Hollywood Reporter

"Noteworthy for its "historical verite " approach – no talking head interviews, no narration, no B-roll footage or reenactments – Let the Fire Burn brings the tragic events of May 13, 1985, back to life, forcing audiences to ask how police, fire department and city officials could stand by and watch as a helicopter dropped an incendiary device on the MOVE compound in West Philadelphia, and then let the subsequent fire rage into the night, ultimately leveling three city blocks and destroying 61 homes." -Steven Rea, Philly.com

"Dispensing with the usual retrospective accounts and analytical chin-scratching, Osder creates both intensity and intimacy, inviting viewers simply to watch and listen as a tragedy – born of unchecked aggression, incoherent ideology and appallingly faulty logic – unfolds." -Ann Hornaday, The Washington Post

"It's remarkable, gripping storytelling, told in grainy footage that nonetheless crackles with life, and it leaves the viewer angry at the senseless loss of lives and property. A clergyman, on the hearings panel, quietly reminds us what's at the heart of the entire, yearslong war between the police and MOVE: that it's possible to forget, in the heat of anger and procedure, that the person on the other side of a conflict is a human being." -Moira Macdonald, The Seattle Times

"Resisting the urge to include present-day interviews with any of the on-camera subjects – which would have broken the you-are-there intimacy and intensity of the archival footage – the documentary plays like a perfectly preserved time capsule whose contemporary relevance is without question. By calmly and unsettlingly laying out a snapshot of a city's darkest moments, Let The Fire Burn transcends its era to speak to the troubling issues of class, race and power that still haunt America 28 years later." -Tim Grierson, Screen International

== See also ==
- Post–civil rights era African-American history
- If a Tree Falls – 2011 Oscar-nominated documentary film by Marshall Curry similar in content
- Recorder: The Marion Stokes Project – 2019 documentary film featuring footage of the Philadelphia bombing
