= John H. Powell Jr. =

American politician

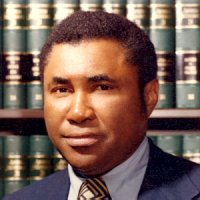

Chair of the Equal Employment Opportunity Commission
- In office December 28, 1973 – March 18, 1975
- President: Richard Nixon; Gerald Ford
- Preceded by: William H. Brown III
- Succeeded by: Ethel Bent Walshs

John H. Powell Jr. (c. 1931–1994) was an American politician. He served as chair of the Equal Employment Opportunity Commission under Presidents Nixon and Ford from 1973 to 1975.

He earned degrees from Howard University (BA), New York University School of Law (LLM), and Harvard Law School (JD).
