= Duffy's Cut =

Railroad line in Pennsylvania, USA

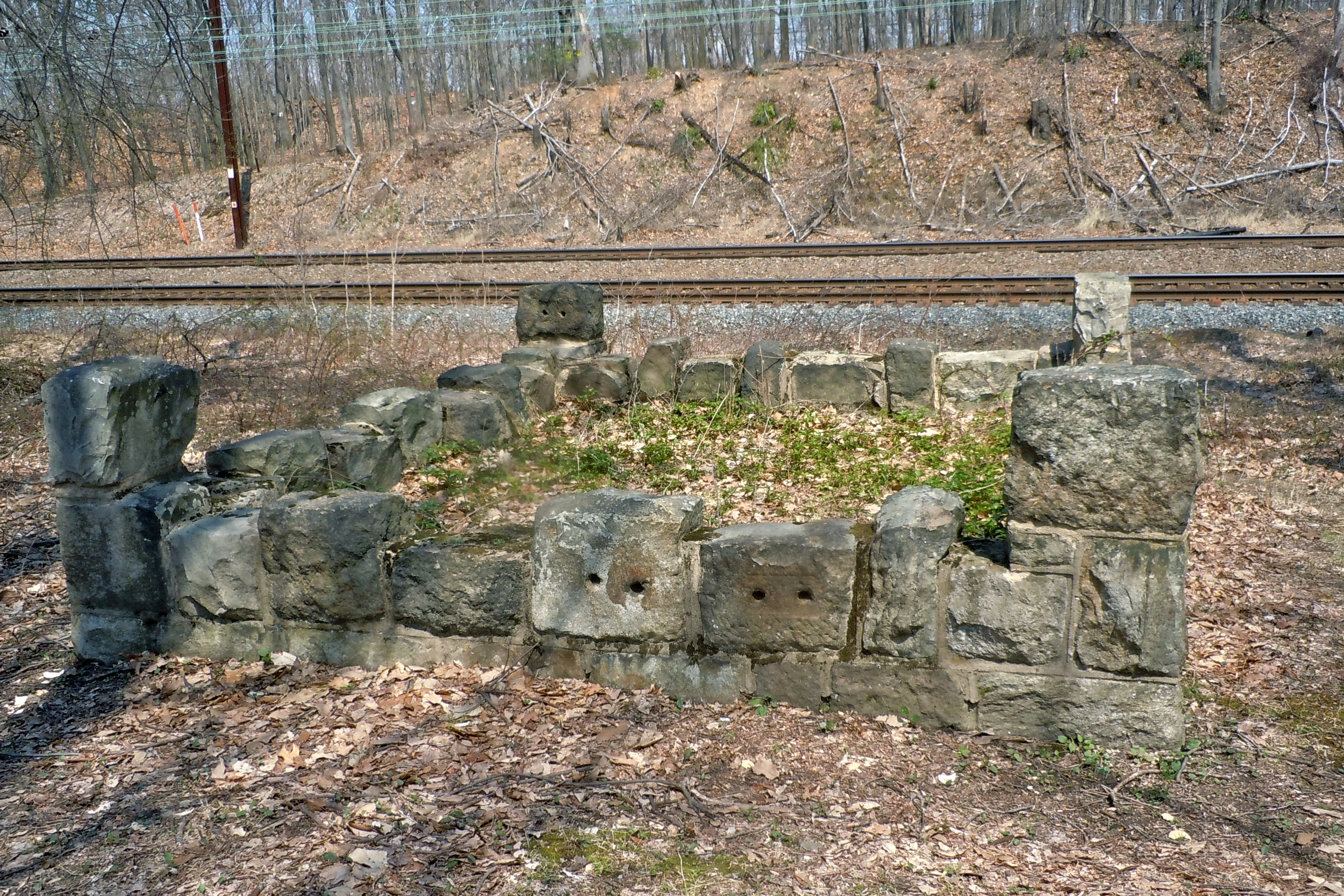
- Enclosure where the majority of human remains are believed to rest, possibly after having been moved
- Interactive map of Duffy's Cut
- Coordinates: 40°02′14″N 75°31′57″W
- Country: United States
- Town: Malvern, Pennsylvania

Duffy's Cut is the name given to a stretch of railroad tracks about 30 miles (48 km) west of Philadelphia, Pennsylvania, United States, originally built for the Philadelphia and Columbia Railroad in the summer and fall of 1832. The line later became part of the Pennsylvania Railroad's Main Line. Railroad contractor Philip Duffy hired 57 Irish immigrants to lay this line through the area's densely wooded hills and ravines. The workers came to Philadelphia from the Ulster counties of Donegal, Tyrone, and Londonderry to work in Pennsylvania's nascent railroad industry. While their fates are unclear, a theory based on a record from a railroad archive suggests all 57 died of cholera during the 1826–1837 cholera pandemic. The remains of seven have been discovered at the site, and forensic evidence suggests that some may have been murdered, perhaps due to fear of contagion as the pandemic spanned several continents over many years. While this has become the most popular theory, a coroner who studied the bones believes the alleged bullet holes and injuries were actually due to natural decomposition and post-mortem damage.

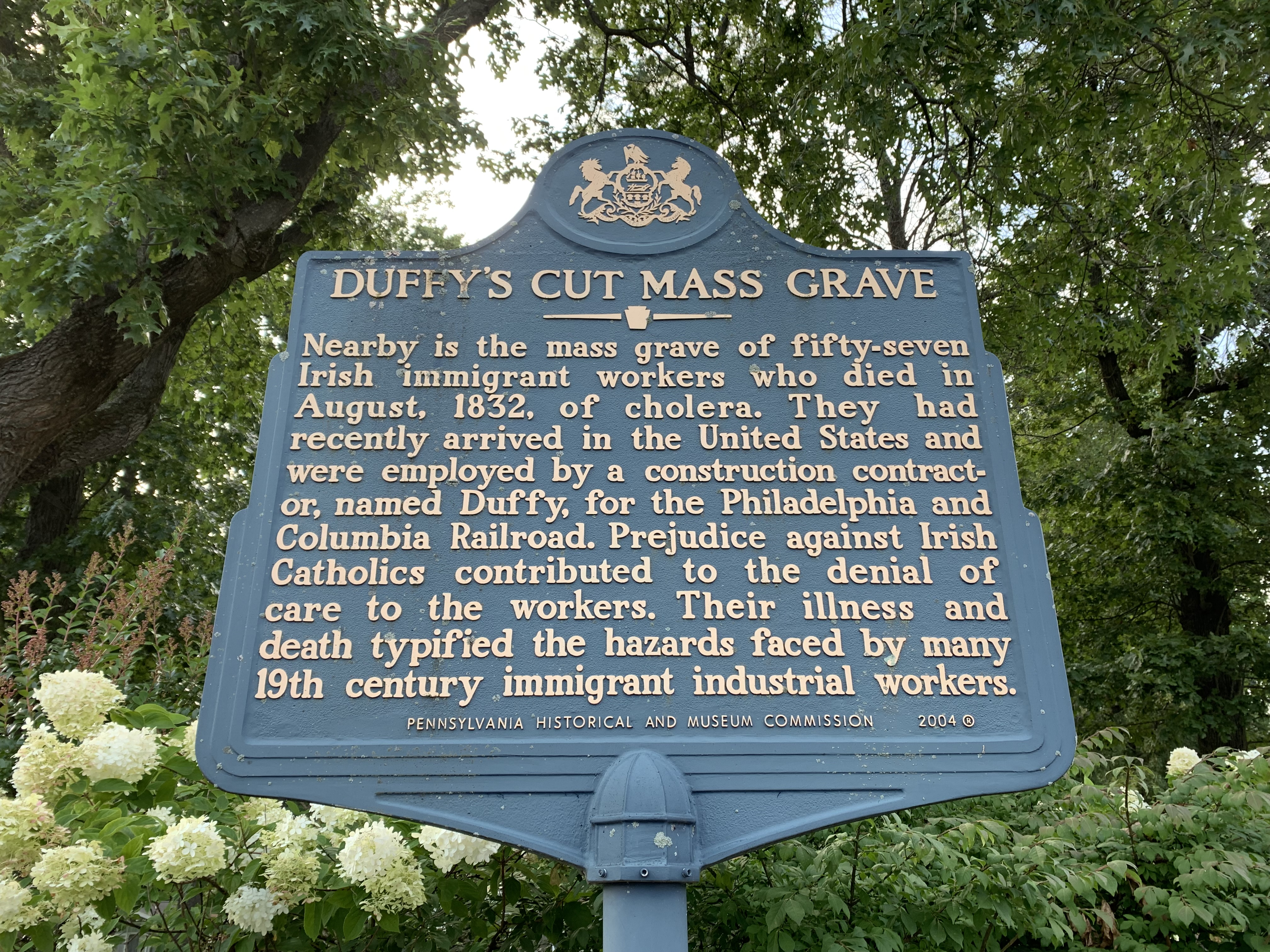
State historical marker near the site

The site is located in East Whiteland Township, Pennsylvania, 1,500 feet (460 m) northeast of the intersection of King Road and Sugartown Road, where a Pennsylvania state historical marker has been placed.

== History ==
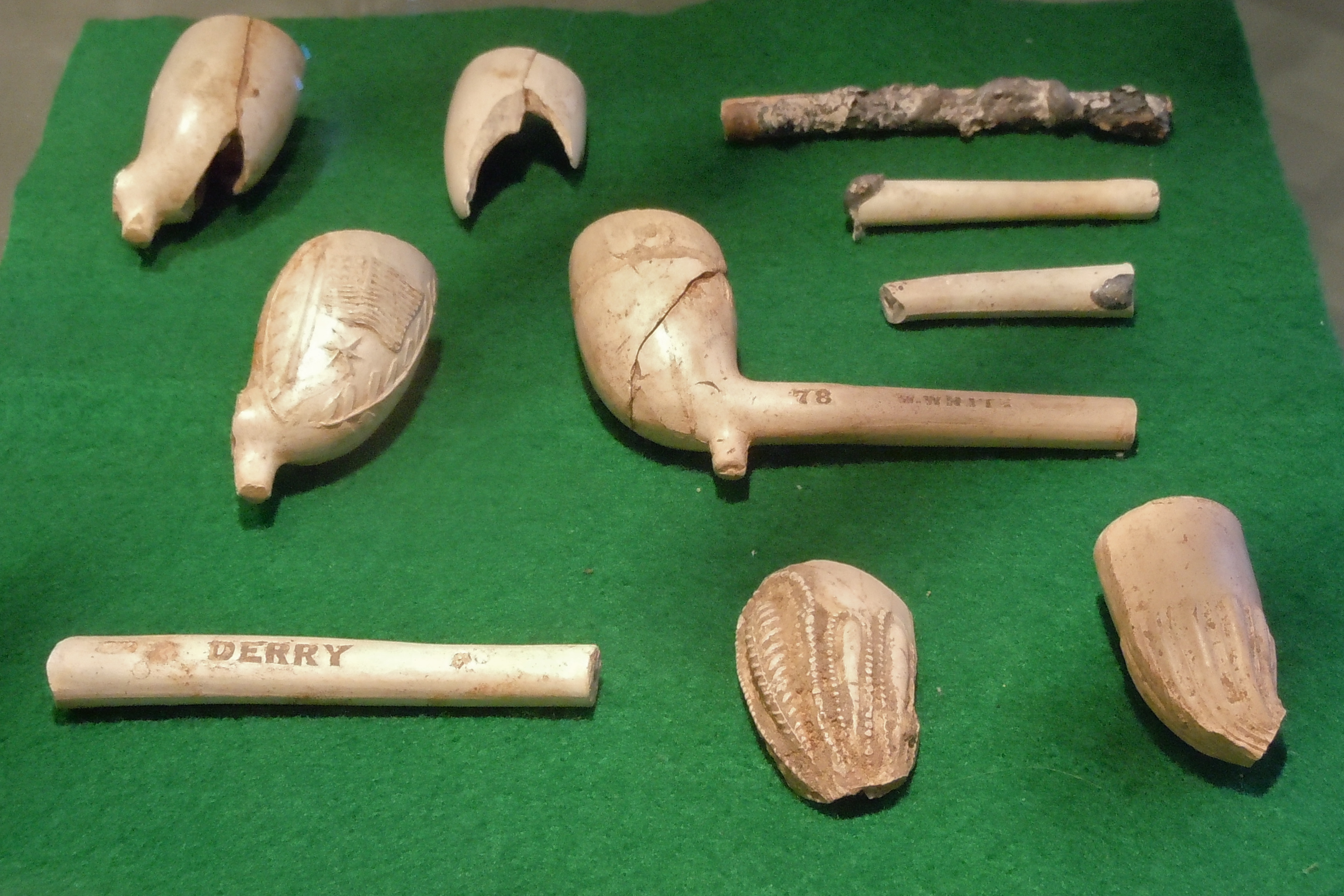
Pipes recovered at the site

Immigrants generally and Irish Catholics specifically were often viewed by the owners and managers of railroad and coal mining companies as expendable components, and by Anglo-Germanic Americans as unwholesome and even dangerous.

Official record of the deaths at Duffy's Cut remained locked in the vaults of the Pennsylvania Railroad (PRR) until Joseph Tripican, a secretary to a former PRR president, removed them after the company's bankruptcy in 1970. In the 1990s, one of Tripican's grandsons, Reverend Dr. Frank Watson, discovered the papers in a file and began to research the history with his brother Dr. William Watson, Professor of History, and adjunct professors Earl Schandelmeier and John Ahtes of Immaculata University.

On June 18, 2004, a Pennsylvania state historical marker was dedicated near the site. The text of the marker reads, "Nearby is the mass grave of fifty-seven Irish immigrant workers who died in August, 1832, of cholera. They had recently arrived in the United States and were employed by a construction contractor, named Duffy, for the Philadelphia and Columbia Railroad. Prejudice against Irish Catholics contributed to the denial of care to the workers. Their illness and death typified the hazards faced by many 19th century immigrant industrial workers."

In August 2004, the site began undergoing archaeological excavation by a research team headed by Dr. William Watson from Immaculata University, Rev. Dr. Frank Watson, Earl Schandelmeier, and John Ahtes. The Duffy's Cut Project team consisted of four primary members, William Watson, Frank Watson, John Ahtes (who died in 2010) and Earl Schandelmeier at Immaculata University. On March 20, 2009, the first human bones were unearthed by researchers Robert Frank and Patrick Barry, consisting of two skulls, six teeth and eighty other bones. The researchers announced their discovery on March 24, 2009. Bone expert Janet Monge was included in the analysis of skeletal remains.

On March 9, 2012, the remains of five men and one woman from those who died at Duffy's Cut Shanty Town were laid to rest with a religious service at West Laurel Hill Cemetery in Bala Cynwyd, Pennsylvania. The men and woman were unearthed by researchers from Immaculata University at the location of the Shanty Town near an Amtrak railroad line in Pennsylvania. A sixth body was recovered and identified as John Ruddy from Inishowen, County Donegal; his remains were returned to Ireland for reburial there. In 2013 the remains of Catherine Burns of County Tyrone who died in Duffy's Cut in 1832 were reburied in Ireland in 2015 Excavation of the deep burial site was halted when Amtrak, which owns the land, would not issue permits for additional digging because of the site's proximity to the railroad tracks.

== In popular culture ==
=== Television ===
- Tile Films of Dublin, Ireland produced "The Ghost of Duffy’s Cut", a documentary on the story for broadcast on the Irish State Broadcaster RTÉ. They then went on to produce a follow-up with WNET, "Death on the Railroad". as an episode of the PBS series Secrets of the Dead (season 12, episode 3) first aired May 8, 2013 and RTÉ. In this episode, the claim was made that modern forensic science determined that all 57 Irish railroad workers did not perish as the result of cholera. Based on the perimortem trauma found on the skulls of four of the bodies discovered at the site, some of the workers may have been murdered. Among the possible motives discussed in the documentary for the murder of the railroad workers was a fear of cholera within the local community adjacent Duffy's Cut.
- The American TV Series Secrets of the Underground presented the Duffy's Cut grave story in the first part of the show's episode entitled "America's Buried Massacre" (Season 1, Episode 4).

=== Print ===
- Greenwood Publishing Group published The Ghosts of Duffy's Cut in July 2006.
- Duffy's Cut is a key setting in Paul Lynch's 2013 novel Red Sky in Morning.
- In 2018, authors and researchers William E. and J. Francis Watson published the true crime book Massacre at Duffy's Cut: Tragedy and Conspiracy on the Pennsylvania Railroad.

"Duffy's Cut"

Song by Christy Moore and Wally Page (writer)
- Language: English
- Published: 2009
- Songwriter: Wally Page

=== Music ===
- Robert Sheldon wrote a song that features Brian Boru's March called "Mystery of Duffy's Cut", which incorporates other Irish songs and deals with the mystery of it.
- Irish musician Christy Moore released a song, written by Wally Page, called "Duffy's Cut" (2009), whose subject matter is the death of the workers on the railway.
- In March 2011, Celtic Punk band The Dropkick Murphys released a song called "The Hardest Mile", which also deals with the newly discovered evidence that some of the men may have been murdered rather than having died of cholera.
- Americana Songwriter Rick Shelley released the song "Dead Horse Hollow" in 2017. The song references young John Ruddy and the 56 other Irish immigrants lost to Duffy's cut.
- In 2012, Celtic Punk band The Kilmaine Saints released “57” as part of their album “Drunken Redemption”. This discusses the anti-Irish sentiment in the 1840s and the fact that some may have been murdered.

== Gallery ==
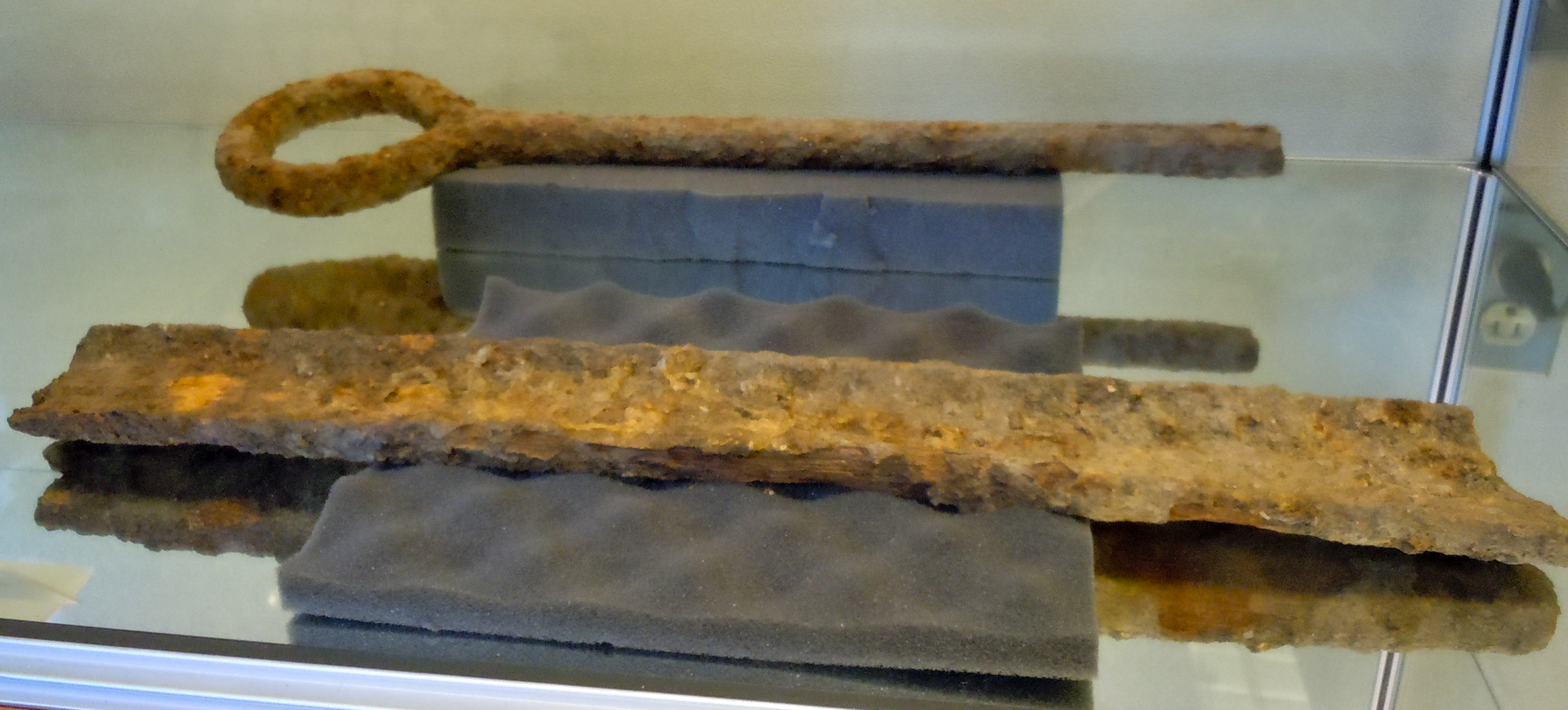
Construction tool (top) and iron strapping (bottom) c. 1832 that was attached to a wooden stringer and used as a rail. Both items recovered at the site.

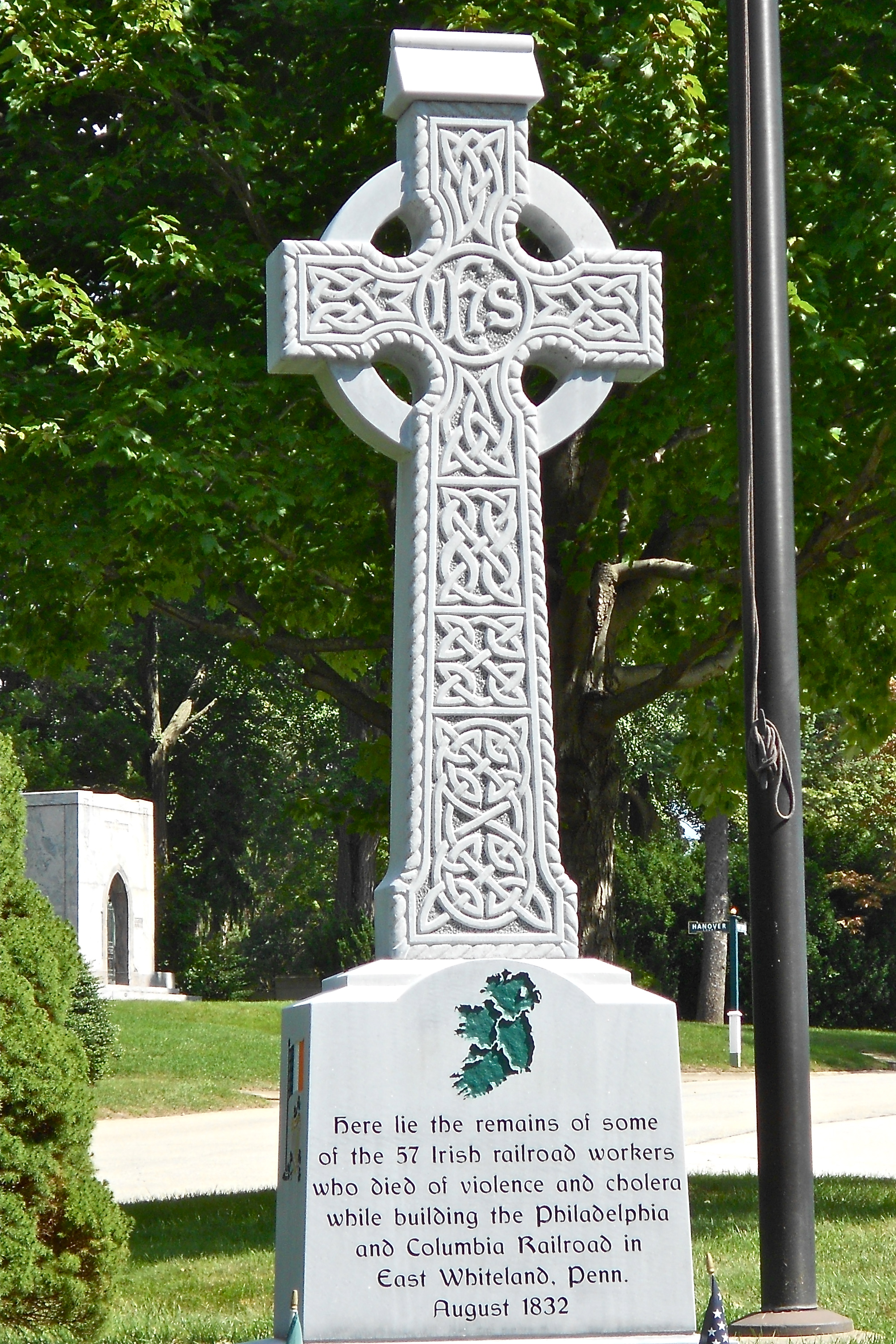
Grave of some of the victims in West Laurel Hill Cemetery

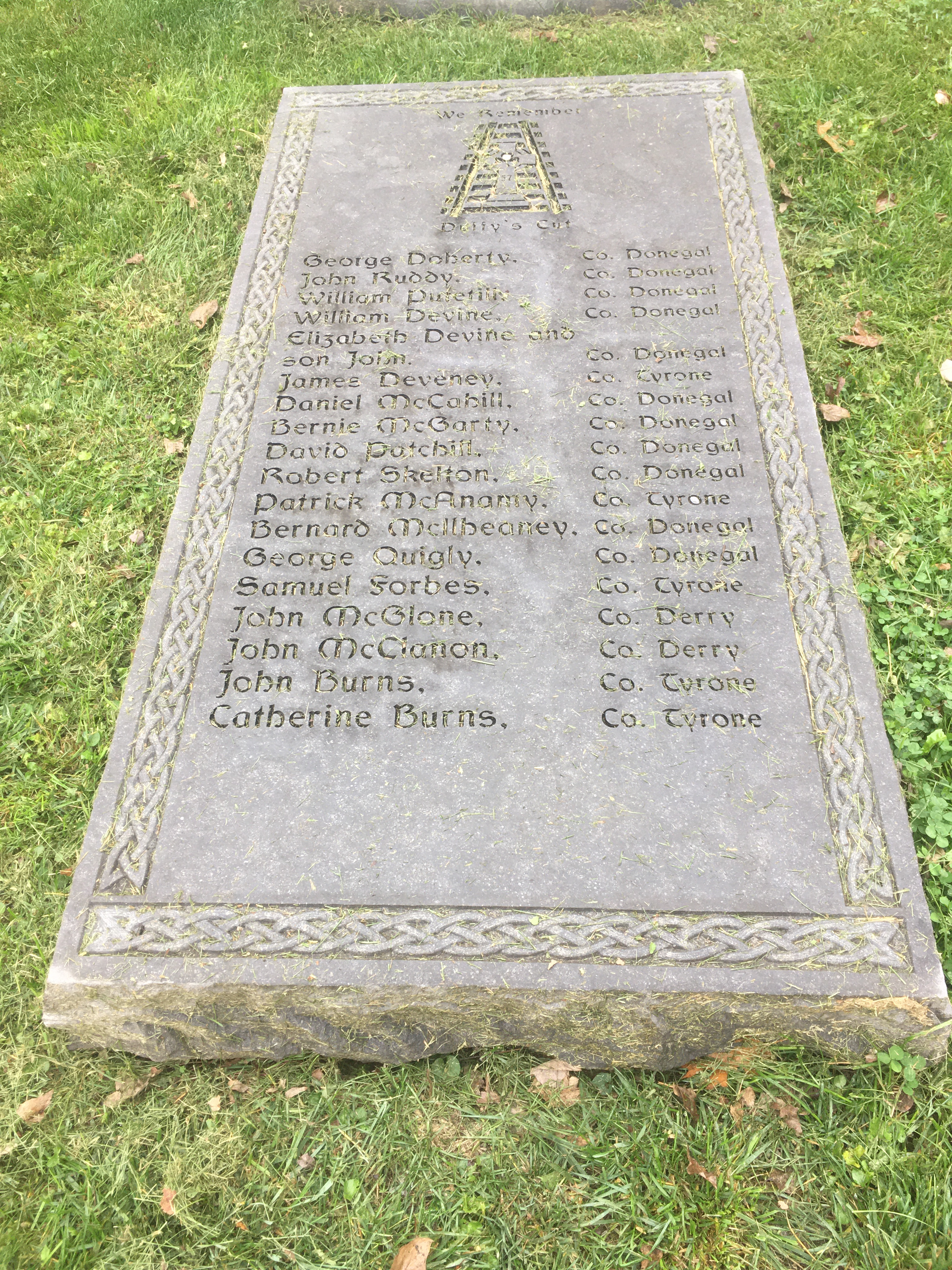
Duffy's cut memorial marker at West Laurel Hill Cemetery

== See also ==
- Cut and fill, earthmoving features in railroad construction
- St. Malachi Church, a 1838 Catholic church located 25 miles (40 km) southwest
