= List of American Trial Lawyer Associations =

American trial lawyer associations are non-profit, professional associations/organizations located throughout the United States. These organizations host attorney education events (such as continuing legal education classes), monitor relevant changes in the law, and advocate for greater access to the civil justice system.

- National
  - American Association for Justice
- Alabama
  - Alabama Association for Justice
- Alaska
  - Alaska Association for Justice
- Arizona
  - Arizona Association for Justice
- Arkansas
  - Arkansas Trial Lawyers Association
- California
  - Alameda-Contra Costa Trial Lawyers Association
  - Association of Business Trial Lawyers San Diego
  - Capitol City Trial Lawyers Association
  - Consumer Attorneys Association of Los Angeles
  - Consumer Attorneys of California
  - Consumer Attorneys of San Diego
  - Criminal Trial Lawyers Association of Northern California
  - Northern California Association of Business Trial Lawyers
  - Orange County Trial Lawyers Association
  - San Francisco Trial Lawyers Association
  - San Mateo County Trial Lawyers Association
  - Black Women Lawyers Association of Northern California
  - California Association of Black Lawyers
  - Charles Houston Bar Association
- Colorado
  - Colorado Trial Lawyers Association
- Connecticut
  - Connecticut Trial Lawyers Association
- Delaware
  - Delaware Trial Lawyers Association
- District of Columbia
  - International Trade Commission Trial Lawyers Association
  - Trial Lawyers Association of Metro Washington D.C.
- Florida
  - Association of Defense Trial Attorneys
  - Central Florida Trial Lawyers Association
  - Florida Justice Association
  - Miami-Dade Trial Lawyers Association Board
  - Palm Beach County Justice Association
  - Tampa Bay Trial Lawyers Association
- Georgia
  - Georgia Trial Lawyers Association
- Hawaii
  - Hawaii Association for Justice
- Idaho
  - Idaho Trial Lawyers Association
- Illinois
  - Illinois Trial Lawyers Association
- Indiana
  - Indiana Trial Lawyers Association
- Iowa
  - Iowa Association for Justice
- Kansas
  - Kansas Association for Justice
- Kentucky
  - Kentucky Justice Association
- Louisiana
  - Louisiana Association for Justice
- Maine
  - Maine Trial Lawyers Association
- Maryland
  - Maryland Association for Justice
- Massachusetts
  - Massachusetts Academy of Trial Attorneys
- Michigan
  - Michigan Association for Justice
- Minnesota
  - Minnesota Association for Justice
- Mississippi
  - Mississippi Association for Justice
- Missouri
  - Missouri Association of Trial Attorneys
- Montana
  - Montana Defense Trial Lawyers Association
  - Montana Trial Lawyers Association
- Nebraska
  - Nebraska Association of Trial Attorneys
- Nevada
  - Nevada Justice Association
  - Western Trial Lawyers Association
- New Hampshire
  - New Hampshire Association for Justice
- New Jersey
  - New Jersey Association for Justice
- New Mexico
  - New Mexico Trial Lawyers Association & Foundation
- New York
  - NYS Academy of Trial Lawyers
  - New York State Trial Lawyers Association
- North Carolina
  - North Carolina Advocates for Justice
- North Dakota
  - North Dakota Association for Justice
- Ohio
  - Ohio Association for Justice
- Oklahoma
  - Oklahoma Association for Justice
- Oregon
  - Oregon Trial Lawyers Association
- Pennsylvania
  - Pennsylvania Association for Justice
  - Philadelphia Trial Lawyers Association
  - Western Pennsylvania Trial Lawyers Association
- Rhode Island
  - Rhode Island Association for Justice
- South Carolina
  - South Carolina Association for Justice
  - South Carolina Defense Trial Attorneys Association
- South Dakota
  - South Dakota Trial Lawyers Association
- Tennessee
  - Tennessee Association for Justice
- Texas
  - Capital Area Trial Lawyers Association
  - Dallas Trial Lawyers Association
  - Houston Trial Lawyers Association
  - San Antonio Trial Lawyers Association
  - Tarrant County Trial Lawyers Association
  - Texas Trial Lawyers Association
- Utah
  - Utah Association for Justice
- Vermont
  - Vermont Association for Justice
- Virginia
  - Virginia Trial Lawyers Association
- Washington
  - Washington State Association for Justice
- West Virginia
  - West Virginia Association for Justice
- Wisconsin
  - Wisconsin Association for Justice
- Wyoming
  - Wyoming Trial Lawyers Association
