= Walnut Park Plaza Hotel =

- U.S. National Register of Historic Places
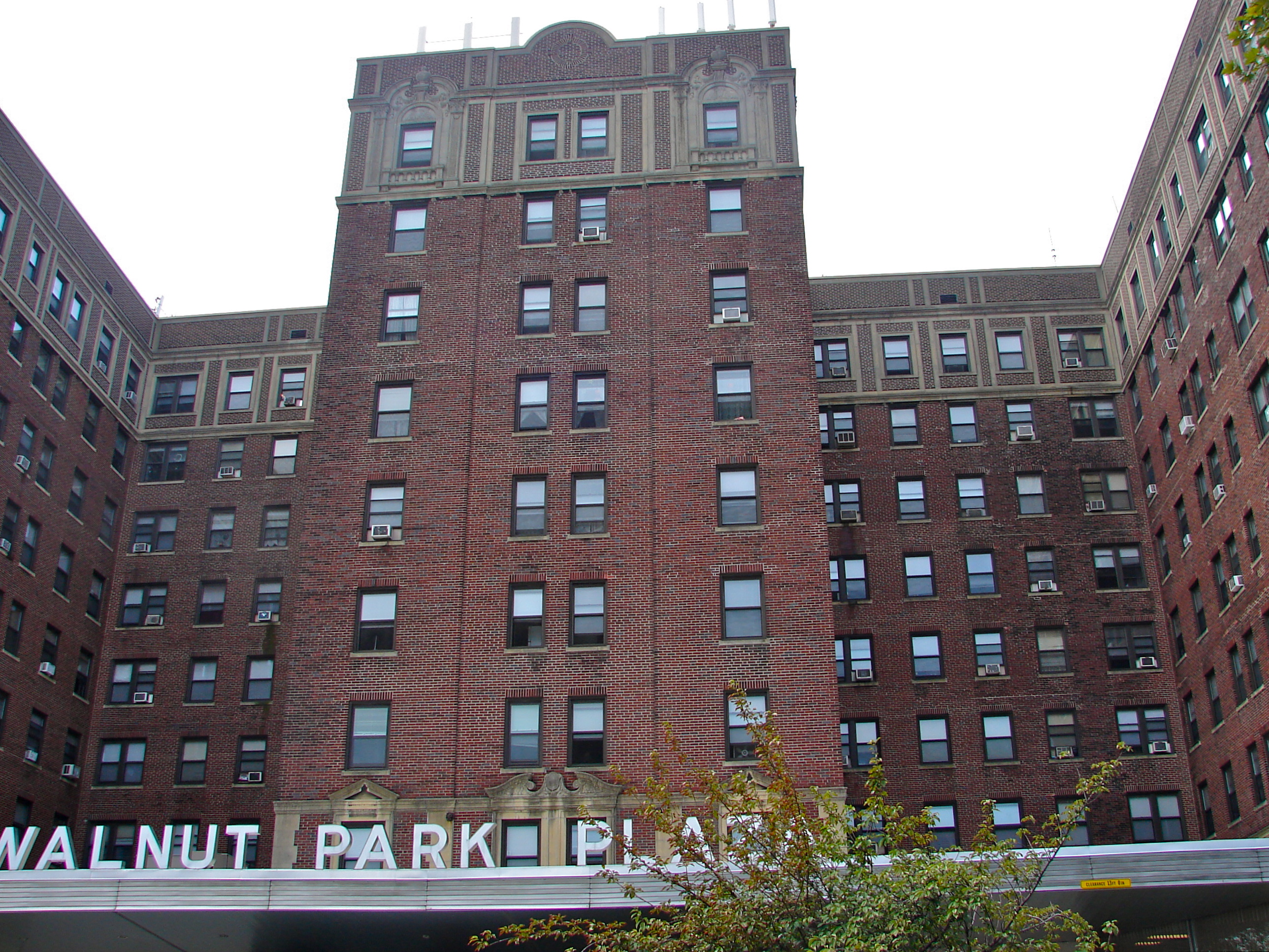
- Walnut Park Plaza, September 2010

- Location within Philadelphia Location within Pennsylvania Location within the United States
- Location: 6232-6250 Walnut St., Philadelphia, Pennsylvania
- Coordinates: 39°57′33″N 75°14′50″W
- Area: less than one acre
- Built: 1928
- Architect: Stetler & Deysher; Massiah, Frederick McDonald
- Architectural style: Classical Revival
- NRHP reference No.: 05000416
- Added to NRHP: May 10, 2005

The Walnut Park Plaza Hotel is an historic apartment hotel in the Cobbs Creek neighborhood of Philadelphia, Pennsylvania, United States.

It was added to the National Register of Historic Places in 2005.

== History and architectural features ==
Built in 1928, this historic structure is a nine-story, red brick building that was designed in the Classical Revival-style. The tower takes an "E" shape above the second story. The building was remodeled in 1955. The building has 224 residential units, ranging in size from 539 to 836 square feet (50 – 78 m^{2}). Also located on the property are two outbuildings that once provided access to underground storage. It has operated as a residence for senior citizens since 1963.
