= American Association for Justice =

American advocacy and lobbying organization

- Purpose: Oppose tort reform
- Headquarters: Washington, D.C.
- Revenue: $31.7 million (2024)
- Expenses: $28.7 million (2024)
- Website: www.justice.org

The American Association for Justice (AAJ), formerly the Association of Trial Lawyers of America (ATLA), is a nonprofit advocacy and lobbying organization for plaintiff's lawyers in the United States. Focused on opposing tort reform, the organization is one of the Democratic Party's most influential political allies, according to The Washington Post.

== History ==
In 1946, nine plaintiffs' attorneys involved in workers' compensation litigation founded the National Association of Claimants' Compensation Attorneys (NACCA). As their work broadened beyond workers' compensation, in 1960 the NACCA changed its name to the National Association of Claimants' Counsel of America, and four years later, to the American Trial Lawyers Association. In 1972, the group changed its name to the Association of Trial Lawyers of America (ATLA).

In 1977, ATLA's headquarters moved from Boston to Washington, D.C.

In 2006, ATLA became the American Association for Justice (AAJ). Around the same time, a group of attorneys quietly began forming a competitor organization to AAJ. The competitor organization called itself The American Trial Lawyers Association, or TheATLA. TheATLA solicited thousands of AAJ's members to join. AAJ filed suit to force TheATLA to drop the name, arguing it was confusing AAJ members and infringing a trademark held by AAJ. In 2010, the case was dropped after the AAJ's lawyers filed for an immediate dismissal and was granted by the presiding judge.

In 2026, Munley Law partner Marion Munley was named President-Elect of the American Association for Justice.

In 2023, Sean Dominick was sworn in as the new president of the American Association for Justice.

== Political positions ==
The AAJ's most notable position is promoting the passage of the Forced Arbitration Injustice Repeal Act, a law which bans the practice of enacting pre-dispute arbitration clauses and contractual jury trial waivers. The AAJ claims that tens of millions of Americans sign away their rights to sue companies and are instead required to resolve disputes through binding arbitration, which the AAJ claims is where overwhelmingly white male arbitrators rule against consumers in disputes between consumers and companies.

The AAJ also has taken a stance in raising trucking insurance minimums, arguing that inflation and rising medical costs lower the value of covered insurance, provided that insurance typically covers only $750,000 of a typical $4.9 Million truck accident. Member lawyers of the AAJ and supporters of the AAJ's position state that its support of raising insurance minimums allows truckers to have their insurance catch up with inflation, while critics of the AAJ say the association's $2 million minimum is both arbitrary and not backed up by relevant data.

== Activities ==
Members of the AAJ have been responsible for multibillion-dollar settlements in cigarette cases and millions of asbestos injury claims.

The association has been criticized by organizations such as the United States Chamber of Commerce for its role as a special interest and lobbying group promoting the interests of plaintiffs' lawyers.

In 2006, ATLA's membership voted to change their name to the American Association for Justice. The Chamber of Commerce responded by again criticizing the organization.

The AAJ holds biannual legal conventions in cities such as Las Vegas and Palm Springs.

== See also ==
- David Shrager, past president
- Fred Baron, past president
- List of Trial Lawyer Associations
- Wiedemann Wysocki National Finance Council Award
