= David Shrager =

American lawyer

David S. Shrager (1935–2005) of Philadelphia, Pennsylvania was a United States trial lawyer, author, speaker, and philanthropist. A former president of the Association of Trial Lawyers of America (now known as the American Association for Justice), he specialized in major and complex civil litigation representing consumers, injured healthcare workers and individuals, and appeared before the Supreme Court of Pennsylvania.

== Career ==
Shrager was a founding member of Trial Lawyers for Public Justice (now known as Public Justice Foundation), and was a principal founder of the Pennsylvania Trial Lawyers Association (now the Pennsylvania Association for Justice and served as president (1971–1972). A lifetime member of the Association of Trial Lawyers of America, he served as president (1983–1984), and also as president of the Roscoe Pound Foundation (1985–1988), which works to preserve access to the civil-justice system. An expert in medical negligence claims, Shrager testified in 1984 and 1986 before the United States Senate Committee on Health, Education, Labor and Pensions about Medical malpractice in the United States.

Although a leading opponent of No-Fault Insurance, Shrager later edited the definitive treatise on the Pennsylvania No-Fault Motor Vehicle Act. He was also co-author of The Quotable Lawyer. He established a Foundation, which supports artists and arts programs for disadvantaged children, as well as an endowment for research and patient care at the Hospital of the University of Pennsylvania.

Shrager graduated from the University of Pennsylvania in 1957, and from the University of Pennsylvania Law School in 1960. At Penn he was president of the debate society, an All-Ivy League fencing champion for epee, and a member of Phi Beta Kappa. After graduating from the law school, he began his legal career at what became the Philadelphia law firm of Farage & Shrager. Later he was the senior partner of Shrager, McDaid, Loftus, Flum & Spivey, and finally Shrager, Spivey & Sachs. The firm he founded is now called Shrager & Sachs.

== Notable cases ==
Notable cases for which he served as court-appointed lead counsel include a national class action on behalf of thousands of hemophiliacs with HIV-related illness. In addition, he conducted multi-district litigation on behalf of healthcare workers with latex allergy.

In a 1987 lawsuit against the City of Philadelphia, Shrager represented the father of Michael Ward, a.k.a. Birdie Africa, the sole child survivor of the much-publicized 1985 MOVE bombing and fire in Philadelphia for injuries suffered in the fire. Under a 1996 settlement agreement, the Wards received $840,000.

== Honors and awards ==
During his extensive service to the Association of Trial Lawyers of America, Shrager was chair of ATLA's organization review committee, and was named to the executive committee. He received two of its most prestigious awards: the 1995 Harry M. Philo Award in recognition of his leadership in protecting the rights of individuals through the civil-justice system; and the 2004 Leonard M. Ring Award for his distinguished service to the association. Shrager was also one of the first volunteer lawyers to participate in "Trial Lawyers Care" a major pro bono effort undertaken to aid victims of the terrorist attacks of September 11, 2001.

David Shrager's other professional honors included an appointment to the civil-procedure rules committee of the Supreme Court of Pennsylvania (1978–1988), service as chair of the civil-litigation section of the Pennsylvania Bar Association, service on the board of the Pennsylvania Bar Institute (1982–1984), and appointment as a judge pro-tem of the Philadelphia Court of Common Pleas (1992–1998). Additionally, he served as a diplomat of the National Board of Trial Advocacy (1980–1986) and for six years on the overseers board of the Institute of Civil Justice at the RAND Corporation. He was recognized for many years in The Best Lawyers in America and listed in the Bar Register of Preeminent Lawyers.

In 2006, in honor of Shrager's lifetime of contributions to the bar, the Association of Trial Lawyers of America (now the American Association for Justice or AAJ) renamed its president's annual recognition award "The David S. Shrager President's Award." In 2007, the Philadelphia Bar Association inducted Shrager as a "Legend of the Bar." In July 2009, Shrager was inducted into AAJ's "Hall of Fame," in recognition of "outstanding integrity, upstanding character, and dedication to AAJ and to the overall public welfare of all Americans."
