= Holmes Junior High School (Philadelphia) =

- U.S. National Register of Historic Places
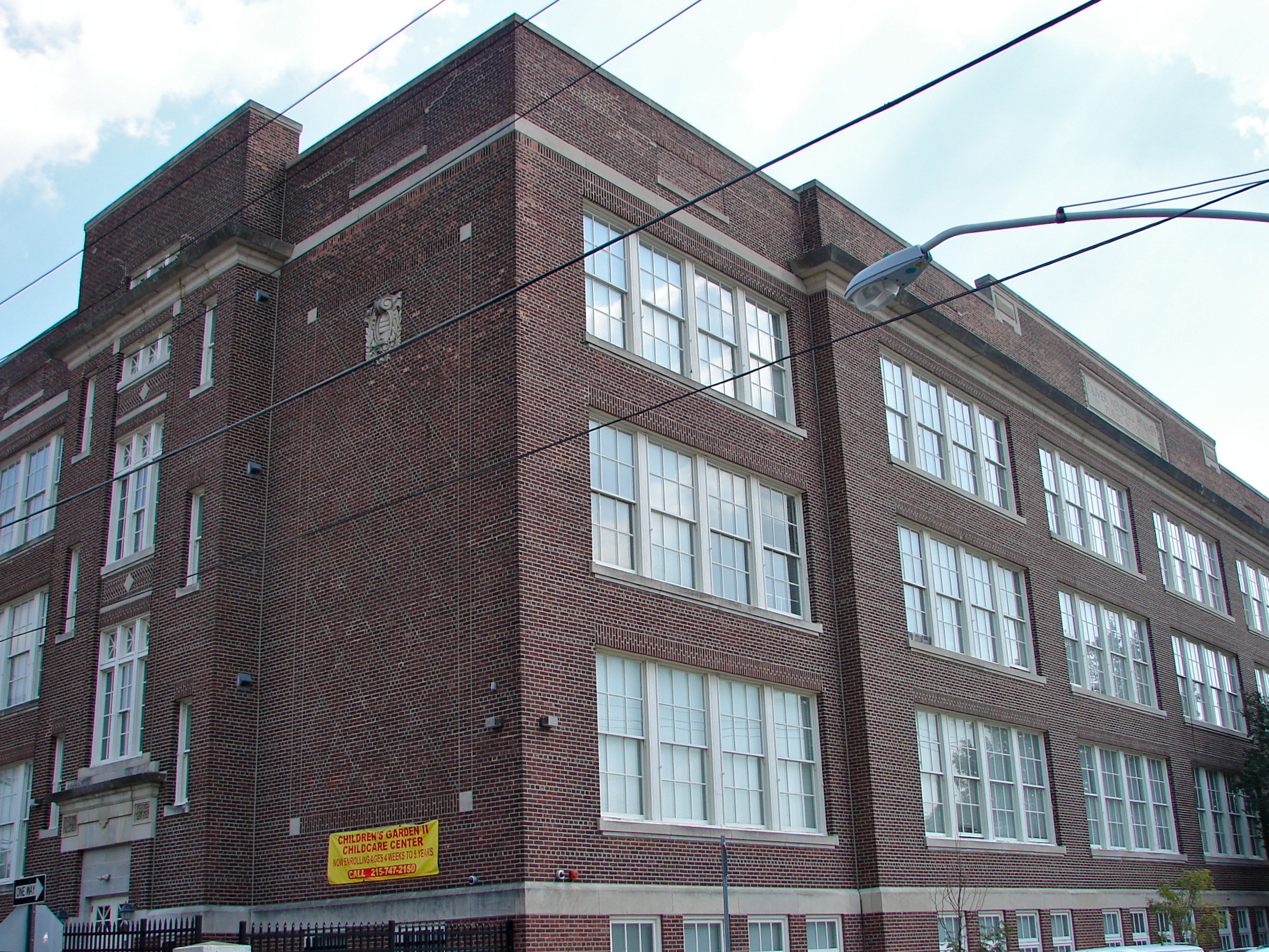
- Holmes Junior High School, September 2010

- Location within Philadelphia Location within Pennsylvania Location within the United States
- Location: 5429 Chestnut St., Philadelphia, Pennsylvania
- Coordinates: 39.9594°N 75.2308°W
- Area: 1.1 acres (0.45 ha)
- Built: 1916–1917
- Built by: Moore, Warren, & Co.
- Architect: Henry deCourcy Richards
- Architectural style: Classical Revival
- Website: https://holmes.djusd.net/
- MPS: Philadelphia Public Schools TR
- NRHP reference No.: 88002281
- Added to NRHP: November 18, 1988

Holmes Junior High School is a historic junior high school building in the West Philadelphia neighborhood of Philadelphia, Pennsylvania, United States.

The building was added to the National Register of Historic Places in 1988.

== History and architectural features ==
Designed by Henry deCourcy Richards, Holmes Junior High School was built between 1916 and 1917. It is a three-story, six-bay, brick building, which was placed on a raised basement and designed in the Classical Revival-style.An addition was made to the U-shaped building shortly after it was completed in 1917, which features a slightly projecting center section, stone cornice and brick parapet. The school is named after Supreme Court Justice Oliver Wendell Holmes.
