= Janet Monge =

American anthropologist and curator

Academic background
- Education: Pennsylvania State University; University of Pennsylvania

Academic work
- Discipline: Physical anthropology

Janet Monge is an American physical anthropologist who was the keeper and curator of the physical anthropology section at the Penn Museum, the associate director and Manager of the Penn Museum Casting Program, and Adjunct Associate Professor at the University of Pennsylvania. Philadelphia Magazine named Monge "Best Museum Curator" in 2014. Monge's work covers nearly the entire spectrum of biological anthropology from paleoanthropology to forensic anthropology. Her research interests include human evolution, human skeletal biology, bioarchaeology, and life-history/paleodemography. Monge contributed to the analysis of the burnt remains of the 1985 MOVE bombing victims, and drew criticism that she had used remains from the bombing without the family's knowledge or consent. Monge had left her position at Penn by December 2023.

== Life and career ==
Monge earned her doctorate at the University of Pennsylvania in 1991. During her PhD, she was hired to analyze the burned remains of the MOVE-bombing victims. However, she reached different conclusions about some remains' identities than the city's special commission on MOVE. Since then, she has volunteered her service on a variety of forensic cases in Philadelphia. Despite her forensic skills, Monge's main work actually focuses on several topics including the preservation and accessibility of Computed Tomography (CT) datasets, traditional radiology, human dental micro-anatomy, and production and distribution of high quality fossil casts.

As the associate director and Manager of the Casting Program, Monge oversees 3000 molds and casts representing fossils from every phase of human evolution. Her non-profit efforts ensure museums and universities around the world have access to unique specimens. She also travels worldwide to mold recently excavated fossils to include in the collection. Monge has also received a $1.7 million grant from the National Science Foundation to curate a human evolution exhibit at the Penn Museum titled "HUMAN EVOLUTION: THE FIRST 200 MILLION YEARS". The exhibit ran from 2011 to 2017 when the Penn Museum began preparing for a series of large renovations.

In addition to her research at the Penn Museum, Monge continues to conduct fieldwork. She actively excavates along the Swahili cost of Kenya. Her previous fieldwork included sites in Europe and Australia. In the United States, Monge's work has included high-profile studies of serial killer H. H. Holmes and the Duffy's Cut mass grave site. Recently, Monge contributed to the largest-ever ancient DNA study illuminating millennia of prehistory in South and Central Asia which was published in 2019.

Monge has appeared in two documentaries: Secrets of the Underground (part of America's Buried Massacre series) and Egypt's Ten Greatest Discoveries. She also contributed to the Nova episode "Neanderthals on Trial".

Her work on with the remains of the MOVE bombing victims has been criticised by activists and academics, as well as descendents of the MOVE bombing victims. This led to the City of Philadelphia commissioning an independent review into the history and handling of the remains she worked with and the return of at least part of one set of remains to the families of one victim, although whether all of that persons remains have been returned, and whether the museum holds other remains of identified victims of the MOVE bombing was disputed. In November 2024, the Penn Museum announced that it had found remains of another MOVE bombing victim in its physical anthropology section.

Monge has filed civil lawsuits against the University of Pennsylvania, local papers and activists over their criticism of her handling of these remains.

== Selected publications ==
- Monge J, Kricun M, Radovcic J, Radovcic D, Mann A, Frayer DW. Fibrous dysplasia in a 120,000+ year old Neandertal from Krapina, Croatia. PLoS ONE. 2013;8(6), Art. #e64539. http://dx.doi.org/10.1371/journal.pone.0064539
- Monge, J. M., & Ruhli, F. (2015). The anatomy of the mummy: Mortuiviventes docent—When ancient mummies speak to modern doctors. The Anatomical Record, 298, 935–940.
- Thompson RC, Allam AH, Lombardi GP, Wann LS, Sutherland ML, Sutherland JD, Soliman MA, Frohlich B, Mininberg DT, Monge JM, Vallodolid CM, Cox SL, Abd El-Maksoud G, Badr I, Miyamoto MI, El-Halim Nur El-Din A, Narula J, Finch CE, Thomas GS: Atherosclerosis across 4000 years of human history: the Horus study of four ancient populations. Lancet. 2013, 381: 1211–1222.
- Lewis J. E. DeGusta D. Meyer M. R. Monge J. M. Mann A. E. Holloway R. L . 2011. The mismeasure of science: Stephen Jay Gould vs. Samuel George Morton on skulls and bias. PLoS Biology 9:e1001071, discussed in New York Times June 14, 2011.
- Weiner S, Monge J, Mann A (2008) Bipedalism and parturition: An evolutionary imperative for cesarean delivery? Clin Perinatol 35:469–478, ix.
