= Gregore J. Sambor =

American police commissioner

Commissioner of the Philadelphia Police Department
- In office 1984 – November 1985
- Preceded by: Morton B. Solomon
- Succeeded by: Robert F. Armstrong (interim)

Personal details
- Born: February 22, 1928
- Died: September 15, 2015 (aged 87)
- Spouse: Mary Sambor
- Children: Gregore Sambor, Glenn Sambor, Nicholas Sambor, Marie Sambor
- Occupation: Police Officer

Gregore J. Sambor (February 22, 1928 - September 15, 2015) was an American Police Commissioner of the Philadelphia Police Department from 1984 to 1985. He had a major role in the 1985 bombing of MOVE, in which six adults and five children died after he told firefighters to stand down and "let the fire burn". Sambor argued the group was a terrorist organization.

== 1985 MOVE bombing ==
On May 13, 1985, nearly 500 police officers moved in to execute arrest warrants on MOVE's members. Police commissioner Sambor read a long speech to the members of the organization. When they didn't respond, police moved in to forcibly remove them from the premises, leading to an armed standoff. After the police used over ten thousand rounds of ammunition, Sambor ordered the compound be breached. Two breaching charges made from an FBI-supplied explosive were dropped on the roof of the building, which ignited the fuel of a gasoline-powered generator there. Ramona Africa, the only adult survivor, reported that police shot at anyone attempting to escape the fire. In the end, 11 MOVE members, including five children, were killed in the blaze and 250 civilians were left homeless.

Sambor resigned as police commissioner in November of that year. He said later that he believed Mayor W. Wilson Goode would have fired him by the end of the year if he had not resigned. His resignation came less than a week after hearings into the bombing and fire concluded, during which his actions were portrayed as hasty and ill-considered, and evidence first emerged that he had ordered the fire department to let the fire continue to burn.

Police appointments
Preceded by Morton B. Solomon	Commissioner of Philadelphia Police Department; 1984–1985	Succeeded by Robert F. Armstrong (interim)
