= William H. Brown III =

American lawyer (born 1928)

William Brown
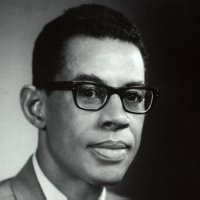

Chairperson of the Equal Employment Opportunity Commission
- In office May 5, 1969 – December 23, 1973
- President: Richard Nixon
- Preceded by: Clifford Alexander
- Succeeded by: John Powell

Personal details
- Born: January 19, 1928 (age 98) Philadelphia, Pennsylvania, U.S.
- Party: Republican
- Education: Temple University; University of Pennsylvania

William H. Brown III (born January 19, 1928) is an American attorney. In 1963, he became a partner at the law firm of Norris Schmidt Green Harris Higginbotham & Brown, Philadelphia's first black-owned law firm. Brown was appointed to the U.S. Equal Employment Opportunity Commission (EEOC) by President Lyndon Johnson in 1968 and named its chairman by President Richard Nixon in 1969. He was the fourth Chairman of the EEOC, serving from May 5, 1969, to December 23, 1973.

== Education and early career ==
Born in Philadelphia, Brown graduated from Temple University in 1952, and from the University of Pennsylvania Law School in 1955. He began working in private practice after graduating, during a time when African-Americans had few, if any, options to practice in established law firms. He joined with a group of several other African American lawyers formed what is considered by many to be Philadelphia's first African-American law firm, Norris Schmidt Green Harris Higginbotham & Brown. Brown also served for some time as the Chief of the Fraud unit and as a Deputy District Attorney for the City of Philadelphia.

== Equal Employment Opportunity Commission ==
Brown was appointed to the EEOC by President Lyndon Johnson in 1968 and named the commission's Chairman by President Richard Nixon in 1969. He was the fourth Chairman of the Equal Employment Opportunity Commission (EEOC). He served in that role until December 23, 1973.

During his time as chairman, the EEOC took significant steps in establishing its role in American life and in fighting discrimination, including seeking to intercede in a telephone rate case being presented by AT&T to the Federal Communications Commission (asserting that because of discriminatory practices, costs for telephone services were higher than they would have been otherwise), securing the enforcement powers granted to the EEOC, and the establishment of five regional litigating centers in Chicago, San Francisco, Atlanta, Philadelphia and Denver, each staffed with thirty lawyers.

== Later career ==
After his time as Chairman of the EEOC, Brown returned to the private practice of law, and as of 2016 was still practicing at the Philadelphia-based law firm of Schnader Harrison Segal & Lewis LLP. He is nationally known in the field of employment discrimination, and has also developed extensive experience with alternative dispute resolution. He has served as a mediator for Federal District Court for Eastern District of Pennsylvania and as an arbitrator for American Arbitration Association.

A notable recognition came in 1985 when he was chosen to chair the Philadelphia Special Investigation Commission investigating the 1985 MOVE bombing.
