= Cobbs Creek, Philadelphia =

Neighborhood in Philadelphia, Pennsylvania

- Cobbs Creek Automobile Suburb Historic District
- U.S. National Register of Historic Places
- U.S. Historic district
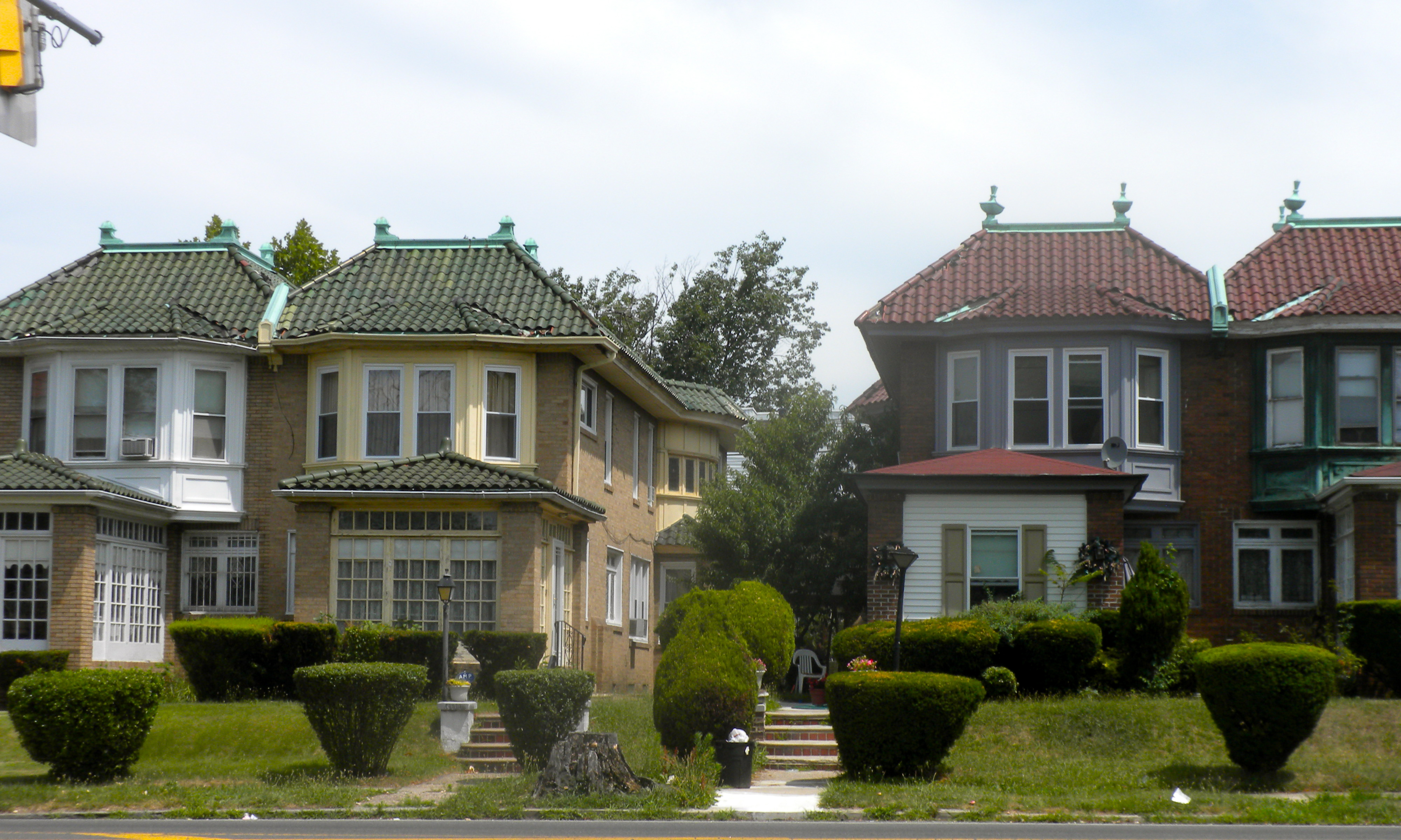

- Location within Philadelphia Location within Pennsylvania Location within the United States
- Location: Roughly bounded by Cobbs Creek Parkway, Spruce St., 52nd St., and Angora St. Philadelphia, Pennsylvania
- Coordinates: 39°57′1″N 75°14′50″W
- Area: 100 acres (40 ha)
- Built: 1880
- Architect: E.A. Wilson; et al.
- Architectural style: Colonial Revival, Tudor Revival, Bungalow/craftsman
- NRHP reference No.: 98001366
- Added to NRHP: November 12, 1998

Cobbs Creek is a neighborhood located in the West Philadelphia section of Philadelphia, Pennsylvania, United States, named for the creek which forms part of Philadelphia's western border. Cobbs Creek is generally bounded by Market Street to the north, the Media/Wawa Regional Rail Line to the south, South 50th Street to the east and Cobbs Creek Park to the west

In 1998, the Cobbs Creek Automobile Suburb Historic District was created, with Cobbs Creek Parkway, Spruce Street, 52nd Street, and Angora Street its boundaries. The District protects 1049 buildings, with Tudor Revival, Colonial Revival, and Bungalow/Craftsman architectural styles contained within the district.

Fires from the 1985 bombing of the MOVE headquarters at 6221 Osage Avenue spread to 64 other buildings in the neighborhood. The destroyed homes were hastily rebuilt by the city, but were later condemned after years of attempted repairs to the shoddy construction.

Also listed on the National Register of Historic Places are the Holmes Junior High School and Walnut Park Plaza Hotel.

== Education ==
=== Primary and secondary schools ===
The School District of Philadelphia operates public schools. Andrew Hamilton Elementary School located at S.56th St. & Spruce St., Sayre High School (formerly a middle school) is located at S.58th St & Walnut St. and West Philadelphia High School.

In 2011 the Roman Catholic Archdiocese of Philadelphia announced the closures of St. Cyprian Catholic School, as its student numbers had declined.

=== Public libraries ===
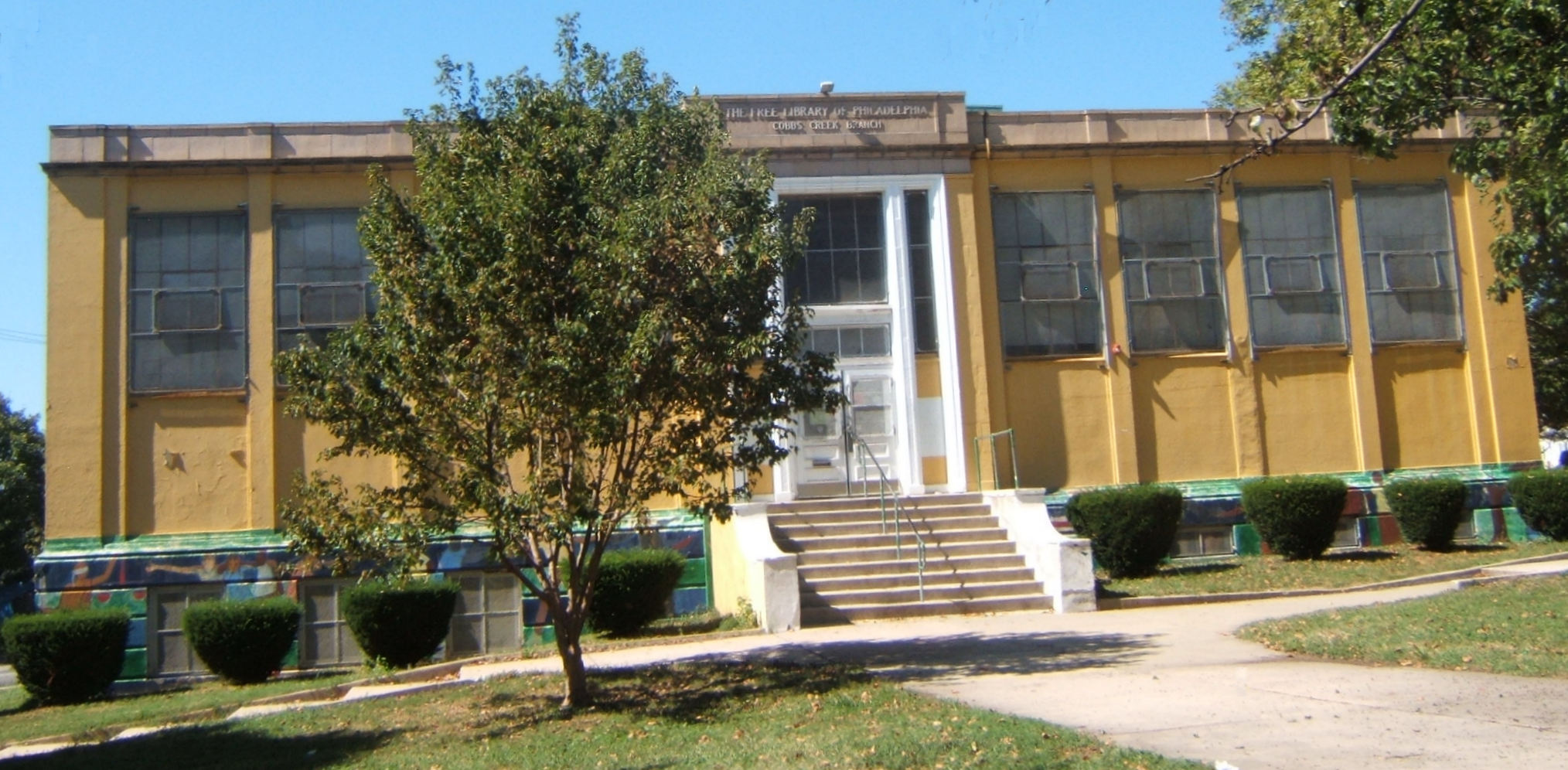
Blanche A. Nixon/Cobbs Creek Branch

Free Library of Philadelphia operates the Blanche A. Nixon/Cobbs Creek Branch at 5800 Cobbs Creek Parkway at the intersection of 59th Street and Baltimore Avenue. The branch opened in 1925 and was renamed in 1990 after an area activist.
