= Crime in Philadelphia =

Statistics about crime activity in the city of Philadelphia

Philadelphia
- Crime rates* (2014)

Violent crimes
- Homicide: 15.9
- Rape: 77.4^{**}
- Robbery: 447.2
- Aggravated assault: 481.1
- Total violent crime: 1021.4

Property crimes
- Burglary: 621.8
- Larceny-theft: 2398.5
- Motor vehicle theft: 367.4
- Arson: 25.6
- Total property crime: 3387.7
- Note: Reported crimes per 100,000 population Source: FBI 2014 UCR data

Crime in Philadelphia, Pennsylvania, has fluctuated considerably over time, with periods of elevated violent and property crime followed by significant declines. Like many major American cities, Philadelphia experienced a sharp increase in gun violence and homicides during the COVID-19 pandemic, reaching a record 562 homicides in 2021. Since then, violent crime has declined substantially. In 2024, the city recorded its lowest overall violent crime rate of the 21st century, and in 2025, Philadelphia recorded 222 homicides, its lowest annual total since 1966. This downward trend has continued into 2026. Crime rates vary considerably across the city's many different neighborhoods, with some areas experiencing higher concentration of violent crime than others.

The legal entities responsible for maintaining law and order are:

- The Philadelphia Police Department (PPD) is the police department.
- The Court of Common Pleas of Philadelphia County (1st Judicial Circuit) is the state trial court.
- The Philadelphia District Attorney is the district attorney.
- The Defender Association of Philadelphia is the government-funded independent public defender office.

== Notable cases and incidents ==
- Philadelphia Election Riot (1742)
- Lombard Street Riot (1842) – Three-day race riot.
- Philadelphia Nativist Riots (1844)
- The Schuylkill Rangers – (mid-1800s) criminal gang – see Jimmy Haggerty.
- Kidnapping of Charley Ross (1874)
- Race riots in Philadelphia during the 1919 Red Summer (1919) - Incidents in May and July. 5 dead.
- Willie Sutton "The Robin Hood of Brooklyn" (1930–1950s) – Robbed most Philadelphia Banks, some twice, captured and tunneled out of Eastern State Penitentiary was recaptured and sent to Holmesburg Prison which he subsequently escaped from by ladder.
- Philadelphia Poison Ring (1938) – At least 70 people poisoned with arsenic, several by their wives.
- Marie Noe (1949–1968) – Murdered eight of her children.
- Joseph Augustus Zarelli (1957) – Four-year-old boy found dead in a cardboard box.
- Philadelphia 1964 race riot (1964)
- Dolores Della Penna – 1972 abduction and dismemberment of Tacony teenager remains unsolved.
- Carl Gugasian – "The Friday Night Bank Robber" (1972-2002) – Perhaps the most successful in American history – robbed banks up and down the east coast.
- Joseph Kallinger – Schizophrenic Serial Murderer (1974–75).
- Ira Einhorn, "The Unicorn Killer" (1977) – Popular counterculture figure killed his girlfriend and hid her body in his closet.
- Ed Savitz (1975–1992) – Sexual predator thought to have abused hundreds of teenage boys.
- Mumia Abu-Jamal (1981) – Convicted for the murder of PPD officer Daniel Faulkner in 1981.
- Joseph Kindler – Serial burglar convicted of 1982 murder, sentenced to death, escaped prison twice, extradited from Canada.
- MOVE (1978,1985) – Activist group which was harassed by the PPD, resulting in the police's purposeful destruction of 65 homes along with 11 deaths in Cobb's Creek neighborhood.
- Abscam – Several Philadelphia/Delaware valley politicians taken down in FBI investigation, videotaped accepting bribes from an Arabian company in exchange for political favors.
- Frankford Slasher (1985–1990) – Thought to have killed several women. Never caught, though a prime suspect referred to only as 'The Minister' was known to police.
- Gary M. Heidnik (1986–1987) – Kidnapped, imprisoned, raped, and tortured six women, two of whom he murdered.
- Harrison Graham (1986–1987) – Killed seven women.
- Raymond Carter (1988) – Convicted of killing Robert "Puppet" Harris; verdict overturned in 1996 due to likelihood of false testimony.
- 39th District corruption scandal (1990s) – Police corruption which led to the overturning of 160–300 cases and release of 100 prisoners.
- Eddie Polec murder case (1994)
- Troy Graves "Center City Rapist" (1997–1999) – Committed five rapes and one murder.
- Lex Street Massacre (Dec. 28th, 2000) – 7 people were murdered in a crack house.
- Murder of Jason Sweeney (2003) – 16 year old murdered by his friends for his paycheck.
- City Hall corruption scandal (2003–05) – mayor's office bugged by FBI, several convictions resulting.
- Tainted Justice – A group of officers from the police department's narcotics unit illegally raided homes and stores in inner city neighborhoods during drug investigations and engaged in illegal activity such as groping women, taking money from cash registers and knocking out store security cameras.
- Kermit Gosnell (?–2010) – Abortion doctor convicted of killing newborns.
- Earl Bradley (?–2010) – Pediatrician charged with hundreds of sex crimes against children.
- Philadelphia basement kidnapping, October 2011, an ongoing investigation into alleged kidnapping of four mentally disabled adults, who were held in a Northeast Philadelphia basement.
- 2019 Philadelphia Packer Marine Terminal cocaine seizure

== Homicides ==
Year	1985	1986	1987	1988	1989	1990	1991	1992	1993	1994	1995	1996	1997	1998	1999	2000	2001	2002	2003	2004	2005	2006	2007	2008	2009	2010	2011	2012	2013	2014	2015	2016	2017	2018	2019	2020	2021	2022	2023	2024	2025
Homicides (city, number)	377	402	427	460	489	500	450	423	437	400	433	412	409	340	335	325	309	288	348	330	375	406	391	331	302	306	326	331	246	248	280	277	315	351	356	499	562	516	408	269	220
Homicides (city, rate)	44.3	43.5	41.6	44.3	42.6	41.7	37.5	35.2	36.4	33.3	36.8	34.3	34.8	25.8	29.4	26.5	20.4	18.9	23.3	22.2	25.6	27.7	27.3	23.0	19.5	19.6	21.2	21.5	15.9	15.9	17.9	17.4	21.1	22.2	22.7	31.8	35.0	32.9	26.0	17.1	
Homicides (US, rate)	11.7	12.9	10.4	11.1	10.8	10.5	9.2	8.7	9.0	8.2	9.2	7.6	7.5	6.0	6.1	5.9	5.6	5.6	5.7	5.5	5.7	5.8	5.7	5.4	5.0	4.8	4.7	4.7	4.5	4.4	4.9	5.3	5.3	4.2	5.1	6.3	6.9	6.3	6.8	5.0	

== Organized crime ==
- Black Mafia and Junior Black Mafia, an African-American crime group based in West Philadelphia
- K&A Gang, based in the Kensington section of the city and one of the largest Irish American gangs in the country
- Philadelphia crime family, an Italian-American organized crime group in South Philadelphia, Atlantic City, and Newark; the largest organized crime group in the city.
- Philadelphia Greek Mob
- Warlocks Motorcycle Club, a motorcycle club involved in drug dealing

== Documentaries ==
- Law and Disorder in Philadelphia, 2008
- The Fear of 13, 2015

== See also ==
- Crime in Pennsylvania
- Crime in the United States
- H. H. Holmes – Early American serial killer, brought to justice by a Philadelphia detective.
- On the Run: Fugitive Life in an American City – non-fiction book by sociologist Alice Goffman
- Vidocq Society – Local crime-solving club
- Youth Empowerment for Advancement Hangout
