= Heeren (surname) =

Heeren is a Dutch and Low German patronymic surname. The now rare given name Heer, Heere or Here is a short form of names containing the Germanic root -her- ("army"), like Herman and Herbert. People with this surname include:

- Arnold Hermann Ludwig Heeren (1760–1842), German historian
- Cor Heeren (1900–1976), Dutch racing cyclist
- Friedrich Heeren (1803–1885), German chemist
- Henri Heeren (born 1974), Dutch footballer
- Irma Heeren (born 1967), Dutch duathete and triathlete
- Paul Heeren (born 1954), Australian guitarist and songwriter

Variants

- Achille Vander Heeren (1880–1956), Belgian Catholic biblical scholar
- Aimée de Heeren (1903–2006), Brazilian socialite, wife of Rodman Heeren
- Scott Heeren (1970 – Today), United States Army Veteran, Retired Officer, Golfer
- Trevor Heeren (1995 – Today), United States Army Veteran, Helicopter Mechanic, Businessman

== See also ==
- De Heer, Dutch surname
