= Heera =

Heera may refer to:

- Heera (given name) (includes a list of people with the name)
- Heera (film), a 1973 Indian film
- Al Heera, a locality in the United Arab Emirates
- Heera Group UK, a music group
- Heera Group (India), a fraudulent investment company
- Heera Dom, an Indian poet writing in Bhopuri

== See also ==
- Heer (disambiguation)
- Hera (disambiguation)
- Hira (disambiguation)
- Hiralal, an Indian male given name
- Heeralaal Pannalaal (disambiguation)
