= Hira =

Hira may refer to:

== Places ==
- Cave of Hira, a cave associated with Muhammad
- Al-Hirah, an ancient Arab city in Iraq
  - Battle of Hira, 633AD, between the Sassanians and the Rashidun Caliphate
- Hira Mountains, Japan
- Hira, New Zealand, settlement north-east of Nelson, New Zealand
- Hira (ghetto), an old Jewish ghetto in Tunis, see History of the Jews in Tunisia
- Hira (Greece), an ancient Greek settlement

== Other uses ==
- Hira (surname)
- Hira (given name)
- Hira (mythical monster), among the Songhai people of West Africa
- The Hira Company Ltd, the parent company of Texet Sales Ltd, a British distributor of calculators and electronic devices
- HIRA, a gene
- Hazard Identification and Risk Assessment, a technique used to identify add address occupational safety and health risks
- "Hira", a song by Redgum from their 1984 album Frontline
- Health Insurance Review and Assessment Service (HIRA), a government agency in South Korea
- Hira, the ISO 15924 script code for Hiragana

== See also ==
- Heera (disambiguation)
- Hiralal, an Indian male given name
