= Heer =

Heer may refer to:

== Army ==
- German Army (disambiguation) (German: Heer 'army')
- Austrian Armed Forces
- Swiss Armed Forces

== Arts and entertainment ==
- Heer, titular character of the Heer Ranjha classical Punjabi folk tragedy
- Heer, a character in the 2020 Indian romantic film Happy Hardy and Heer
- Heer (1955 film), a Pakistani film
- Heer (TV series), a Pakistani Urdu-language TV series
- "Heer" (instrumental), by Junoon, 1991
- "Heer", a song from the 2012 Indian film Jab Tak Hai Jaan
- "Heer", a song from the 2025 Indian film Fateh

== Places ==
- Heer, Maastricht, a neighbourhood in the Netherlands
- Heer, Norway

== Other uses ==
- Heer (surname), including a list of people with the name
- Heer's, a former department chain in Springfield, Missouri, US

== See also ==
- Heera (disambiguation)
- Heer Ranjha (disambiguation)
- Heer Sial (disambiguation)
- Hira (given name)
- De Heer, a Dutch surname
