= Heeralaal Pannalaal =

Heeralaal Pannalaal may refer to these Indian films:

- Heeralaal Pannalaal, Bollywood film starring Shashi Kapoor & Zeenat Aman
- Heeralal Pannalal, Bollywood film starring Mithun Chakraborty & Johnny Lever

== See also ==
- Heera (disambiguation)
- Hiralal, an Indian male given name
- Heera Panna, a 1973 Bollywood film
- Pannalal (disambiguation)
