= Sial (disambiguation) =

Sial refers to the composition of the upper layer of the Earth's crust.

Sial may also refer to:

== Places ==
- Sial, Kapurthala, Punjab State, India
- Sial, Khyber Pakhtunkhwa, Pakistan
- Sial Sharif, a small village in Pakistan

== Other uses ==
- SIAL Paris, a trade fair held every two years in Paris
- Air Sial, Sialkot, Pakistan, expected to begin operations in 2019
- Sial (tribe), a Jat tribe of the Punjab region
- Heer Sial (disambiguation)
- Sialkot (disambiguation)
- Swiss International Air Lines
