= Split ergativity =

Feature in the typology of certain languages

In linguistic typology, split ergativity is a feature of certain languages where some constructions use ergative syntax and morphology, but other constructions show another pattern, usually nominative–accusative. The conditions in which ergative constructions are used vary among different languages.

== Nominative–accusative vs. ergative–absolutive ==
Nominative–accusative languages (including Indo-European languages) treat both the actor in a clause with a transitive verb and the experiencer in a clause with an intransitive verb in the same way grammatically. If the language uses case markers, they take the same case. If it uses word order, it is parallel.

For example, consider these two English sentences:

- Jane was chasing Max.
- Jane was sweating.

The grammatical role of "Jane" is identical. In both cases, "Jane" is the subject.

In ergative–absolutive languages (such as Basque and Georgian, or the Eskaleut and Mayan languages), there is a different pattern. The patient (or target) of a transitive verb and the experiencer of an intransitive verb are treated the same grammatically. If the two sentences above were expressed in an ergative language, "Max" in the former and "Jane" in the latter would be parallel grammatically. Also, a different form (the ergative) would be used for "Jane" in the first sentence.

For example, in the following Inuktitut sentences, the subject 'the woman' is in ergative case (arnaup) when occurring with a transitive verb, while the object 'the apple' (aapu) is in absolutive case. In the intransitive sentence, the subject 'the woman' arnaq is in absolutive case.

- Arnaup nirijanga aapu. 'The woman is eating the apple.'
- Arnaq pisuktuq. 'The woman is walking.'

In split ergative languages, some constructions pattern with nominative–accusative, and others with ergative–absolutive.

== Split conditions ==
The split is usually conditioned by one of the following:

1. The presence of a discourse participant (a first or second person) in the proposition. The Australian language Dyirbal behaves ergatively in all morphosyntactic contexts unless one of those is involved. When a first- or second-person pronoun appears, however, it is marked according to a nominative–accusative pattern (with the least-marked case, when it is the agent or intransitive, or with the most marked case, when it is the patient). That can be explained in terms of the high animacy of a first-person or second-person speaker in the animacy hierarchy.
2. The use of certain aspects and/or tenses in the verb. The Indo-Iranian family, for example, shows a split between the perfective and the imperfective aspect. In Hindustani (Hindi-Urdu), a transitive verb in the perfective aspect causes its arguments to be marked by an ergative pattern, and the imperfective aspects trigger accusative marking. The extinct languages of Prakrit and Apabhramsa, on the other hand, display tense-based split ergativity contingent on the usage of a past tense participle.
3. The agentivity of the intransitive subject. In languages like Dakota, arguments of active verbs, such as to run, are marked like transitive agents, as in accusative languages, but arguments of inactive verbs, such as to stand are marked like transitive objects, as in ergative languages. Languages with such a marking are known as split-S languages and are formally a subtype of active languages.
4. Pragmatic considerations or for emphasis, contrast, or clarity. In certain Tibeto-Burmese languages, elicited data has consistent ergative, aspectually split-ergative or active-stative case marking pattern, and in natural discourse the “ergative” marking is found only in some clauses, often a minority, usually with some pragmatic sense of emphasis or contrast (DeLancey, 2011).

== Examples ==
=== Indo-Aryan ===
The phenomenon of split ergativity in the Indo-Aryan languages has been extensively studied, analyzed and scrutinized, particularly in Hindustani, its most widely spoken member. Its origin could be traced to a past passive participle construction in Old Indo-Aryan languages such as Sanskrit, where the subject took the instrumental case and the object took the nominative case, while the verb was inflected into a past tense participle with passive meaning:

devadatt-ena kaṭa-ḥ kṛ-taḥ
Devadatta-INS mat-NOM make-NOM.PPP
'The mat is made by Devadatta.'

devadatta-ḥ ga-taḥ
Devadatta-NOM go-NOM.PPP
'Devadatta is gone.'

The shift from Old to Middle Indo-Aryan gradually eliminated complex past tense conjugations such as the perfect and aorist, leaving the past passive participle construction as the only way to express past tense. This led to a shift in voice from passive to active, thereby forming the tense- and aspect-based split ergativity of later Indo-Aryan languages. However, it is disputed if the past passive participle construction of Old Indo-Aryan constituted a true passive voice, or if it could have been inherently ergative to begin with.

Split ergativity is not present in all Indo-Aryan languages: several Eastern Indo-Aryan languages such as Bengali reverted to a complete nominative-accusative alignment. In such instances, the disappearance of the instrumental case is somewhat correlated with the disappearance of split ergativity.

==== Apabhramsa ====
Much like Prakrit, though far more apparent, the split ergativity of Apabhramsa is tense-based, in that the usage of past tense participles of transitive verbs triggers a change in alignment from nominative-accusative to ergative-absolutive:

phagguṇa-khal-ahŏ dū-u ṇīsāri-u j-eṇa virahi-jaṇ-u kaha va ṇa māri-u.
winter-mean.GEN.SG messenger-NOM.M.SG send-away.PART.PAST.CS-NOM.M.SG who-ERG.M.SG separated-people.NOM.M.SG however if not kill.PART.PAST.CS-NOM.M.SG.
'It [spring] sent away the messenger of the mean winter month, who did not kill [all] the lonely people.'

laddh-a tuhuṃ maiṃ im-aṃmi van-aṃmi.
find-NOM.PAST.PART you.NOM I.OBL this.LOC wood.LOC
‘I have found you in this forest.' [Literally: 'You are found in this forest by me.']

In transitive verbs, the usage of the past tense is accompanied by declining the subject into the instrumental (ie. ergative) case and the object into the nominative (ie. absolutive) case. Consequently, the verb agrees with the object.

==== Hindi–Urdu ====
An example of split ergativity conditioned by the grammatical aspect is found in Hindustani (Hindi-Urdu); in the perfective aspect of transitive verbs (in active voice), the subject takes ergative case and the direct object takes an unmarked absolutive case identical to the nominative case, which is sometimes called direct case. However, in all other aspects (habitual & progressive), subjects appear either in the direct/nominative case or dative case (see dative subjects), while direct objects continue to appear in the direct case (the subject of such sentences is differentiated from the direct object not from a difference in case but from the agreement of the verb with the subject as well as other syntactic and contextual cues such as word order and meaning).

In the following perfective sentence, the agent laṛkē-nē (boy) is marked for ergative case, while the undergoer pustak (book) is in unmarked nominative case. The verb bēcī (bought) has the feminine ending -ī, showing gender agreement with the undergoer pustak (book).

लड़के-ने पुस्तक बेची है।
laṛkē-nē pustak bēcī hai.
boy:MASC.SG.ERG book:FEM.SG.NOM sell:PRF.FEM.SG be:3P.SG.PRS
'The boy has sold a book.'

In the corresponding imperfective (habitual aspect) sentence, the agent laṛkā (boy) is in unmarked nominative case. The habitual participle form bēctā (sell) has the masculine ending -ā and thus agrees with the agent laṛkā (boy).

लड़का पुस्तक बेचता है।
laṛkā pustak bēctā hai.
boy:MASC.SG.NOM book:FEM.SG.NOM sell:HAB.MASC.SG be:3P.SG.PRS
'The boy sells a book.'

Perfective constructions with certain VV (verb-verb) complexes do not employ ergative case marking, if the explicator verb is intransitive (see: ergativity and light verbs in Hindustani). In perfective constructions, the agent argument is ideally assigned with an ergative case; however in cases like the first example shown below that does not happen. This is because the explicator verb gaī (gone) which although undergoes semantic bleaching but still retains its intransitivity which does not allow for an ergative case assignment to the agent argument (i.e., Nīnā). This is why as shown in the second example below, VV complexes involving a transitive explicator verb (e.g., phē̃kā "threw") can employ ergative case to agent arguments.

नीना आम खा गई।
Nīnā ām khā gaī.
Nina:FEM.SG.NOM mango.MASC.SG.NOM eat.NF go:PRF.FEM.SG
'Nina has eaten the mango.'

नीना-ने पत्थर उठा फेंका।
nīnā-ne patthar uṭhā phē̃kā.
Nina:FEM.SG.ERG stone.MASC.SG.NOM pick.NF throw:PRF.MASC.SG
'Nina (picked up and) threw the stones.'

Hindustani employs differential object marking with its accusative postposition, which overrides any ergative agreements between object and verb; the verb takes masculine singular form in such instances:

मैं-ने लड़की-को देखा।
maiṃ-ne laṛkī-ko dekhā.
I.MASC.ERG girl.FEM.ACC see-PRF.MASC.SG
'I saw the girl.'

==== Punjabi ====
Split ergativity in Punjabi works similarly as in Hindustani, though it is only marked for third person subjects, possibly due to the disappearance of the instrumental case in first and second person pronouns:

ਮੈਂ ਕੰਮ ਕੀਤਾ।
main kamm kītā.
I work.M.SG.NOM do.PST.M.SG
'I did the work.'

ਉਹ-ਨੇ ਕੰਮ ਕੀਤਾ।
ō-nē kamm kītā.
pronoun.3P.SG.ERG work.M.SG.NOM do.PST.M.SG
'He/she did some/the work.'

ਤੂੰ ਇਹ ਕਮੀਜ਼ਾਂ ਖਰੀਦੀਆਂ।
tūn ē kamīzān kharīdīān.
you pronoun.3P.SG.NOM shirt.F.PL.NOM buy.PST.F.PL
'You bought these shirts.'

ਉਹ-ਨੇ ਸਾਨੂੰ ਤਿੰਨ ਬੋਤਲਾਂ ਦਿੱਤੀਆਂ।
ō-nē sānūn tin bōtalān dittīān.
pronoun.3P.SG.ERG us.1P.PL.DAT three.NOM bottle.F.PL.NOM give.PST.F.PL
'He/she gave three bottles to us.'

Some western dialects of Punjabi do not mark subject nouns with a postposition, instead inflecting them into the oblique case (which overlaps with the nominative case in unextended nouns), although agreement between verb and object can still be visible:

ਰਾਂਝੇ ਵੰਝਲੀ ਵਜਾਈ।
Rānjhē vanjhalī vajāī.
Ranjha.M.SG.OBL flute.F.SG.NOM play.PST.F.SG.CS
'Ranjha played the flute.'

ਕੁੱਕੜ ਖੇਹ ਉੜਾਈ ਆਪਣੇ ਹੀ ਸਿਰ ਪਾਈ।
kukkaṛ khēh uṛāī āpṇē hī sir pāī.
rooster.M.SG.OBL dust.F.SG.NOM fly.PST.F.SG.CS reflexive.M.SG.OBL only head.M.SG.OBL fall.F.SG.CS
'The rooster kicked up dust only to have it [dust] fall on its head.' [More figuratively: 'The trouble-maker ultimately disgraced himself as a result of his own mischief.']

Similarly to Hindustani, whenever Punjabi exhibits differential object marking with its accusative postposition, the verb is inflected in masculine singular form irrespective of subject or object.

=== Chol (Mayan) ===
The Mayan language Chol has split-ergative person marking.

In transitive clauses, verbs are framed by a person marking prefix (called "set A" in Mayan linguistics) that expresses the subject, and a suffix that expresses the object (= "set B").

Mi a-mek'-oñ
IMPF 2SG.A-hug-1SG.B
'You hug me.'

In intransitive clauses, the subject can either be represented by a set A-person marker, or a set B-person marker, depending on aspect.

In perfective aspect, Chol has ergative–absolutive alignment: the subject of the intransitive verb is expressed by a suffixed person marker, thus in the same way as the object of transitive verbs.

Tyi wayi-yoñ
PRF sleep-1SG.B
'I slept.'

In imperfective aspect, Chol has nominative–accusative alignment: the subject of the intransitive verb is expressed by a prefixed person marker, thus in the same way as the subject of transitive verbs.

Mi a-wayel
IMPF 2SG.A-sleep
'You sleep.'

=== Sahaptin ===
In Columbia River Sahaptin, the split is determined by the person of both subject and object. The ergative suffix -nɨm occurs only for third-person subjects for which the direct object is in the first or the second person.

ku=š i-q̓ínu-šan-a ína wínš-nɨm
and=1SG 3.NOM-see-IPFV-PST me man-ERG
"And the man saw me."

ku=nam i-q̓ínu-šan-a imaná wínš-nɨm
and=2SG 3.NOM-see-IPFV-PST you.ACC man-ERG
"And the man saw you."

ku i-q̓ínu-šan-a paanáy wínš
and 3.NOM-see-IPFV-PST him/her/it man
"And the man saw him."

Another ergative suffix, -in, marks the subject in the inverse. Both subject and object are then always in the third-person.

Direct (same as above example):

ku i-q̓ínu-šan-a paanáy wínš
and 3.NOM-see-IPFV-PST him/her/it man-ERG
"And the man saw him."

Inverse:

ku pá-q̓inu-šan-a paanáy wínš-in
and INV-see-IPFV-PST him/her/it man
"And the man saw him."

=== Semelai ===
In Semelai, ergative marking on agent and agreement in the predicate only occur when the transitive subject (agent) is placed behind the verb, otherwise S-V word orders have no overt markings and definiteness connotations.

ɟkɔɕ ki=ɟəl la=cɔ
porcupine 3SG.A=bark ERG=dog
'(The) dog barked at (the) porcupine.'

cɔ ɟəl ɟkɔɕ
dog bark porcupine
'[Random] Dog(s) bark at porcupine(s).'

== Bibliography ==
- Dixon, R. M. W. (1994). Ergativity. Cambridge University Press. ISBN 0-521-44898-0.
