= Panna =

Panna can refer to:

- Paññā is Pali for "wisdom"; the Sinhala version is Prajñāva

== Food ==
- Aam panna, an Indian drink made from mangoes
- Panna cotta ("cooked cream"), an Italian dessert
- Panna (water), an Italian bottled water

== Places ==
- Panna, Madhya Pradesh, a city in the state of Madhya Pradesh, India
  - Panna district, a district in Sagar Division of Madhya Pradesh
  - Panna Assembly constituency
  - Panna Airport
  - Panna National Park
  - Panna State, a former princely state of India

== People ==
- Panna Rittikrai (1961–2014), Thai martial arts action choreographer, film director, screenwriter and actor
- Panna Udvardy, Hungarian tennis player
- Panna, Indian actress in the 1935 film Bombay Mail
- Panna, a Hungarian nickname for the given name Anna

== Other uses ==
- Panna (fish), a genus of fish in the family Sciaenidae
- Panna (football), a technique in association football

== See also ==
- Pana (disambiguation)
- Penna (disambiguation)
- Prajna (disambiguation)
- Panha (disambiguation)
- Pannalal (disambiguation)
