= Penna (surname) =

Penna is a surname originating in Italy, in an area known as the Papal States. Since Papal names often denoted the place of origin, the Penna family lived in one of several places in Italy named Penna.

Its origins are unrelated to the Hispanic surname Peña or Della Peña, though many have adopted the extra n to become Della Penna.

Penna is also a Telugu surname. It is most commonly found around the surname's namesake, the Penna River, in the south of Andhra Pradesh, India.

Penna is also a surname of Cornish origin. At the time of the British Census of 1881, its frequency was highest in Cornwall (over 72 times the national average) followed by Cumberland, Caernarfonshire and County Durham. In all other British counties, its frequency was below the national average. Traditional Cornish surnames tend to start with 'Tre', 'Pol' or 'Pen'. To quote a Cornish saying, "By the Tre, Pol and Pen, you can tell the Cornishmen". Following the collapse of mining in the 18th and 19th centuries, many Cornish folk emigrated in the great Cornish diaspora. As a result of this, the name Penna can be found in many mining centres around the world, notably Australia, Brazil, Canada, Mexico, New Zealand, South Africa and the United States.

== People ==
- Angel Penna (disambiguation)
- Carlos Victor Penna (1911–1998), Argentine library planner and organizer
- Claudio Della Penna (born 1989 in Rome), an Italian football striker
- David "Dave" Penna (1958–2004), US jockey
- Dolores Della Penna (1954–1972), 17-year-old Philadelphian schoolgirl
- Domingos Soares Ferreira Penna (1818–1888), Brazilian naturalist
- Francesco Orazio Olivieri della Penna (1680–1745), Capuchin missionary to Tibet
- Gal Costa (born Maria da Graça Costa Penna Burgos; born 1945, Salvador, Bahia), Brazilian singer of popular music
- Joe Penna (born 1987), Brazilian guitarist, animator, and filmmaker
- José Luiz Penna (born 1945), Brazilian businessman, musician and politician
- Lucas de Penna (Luca da Penne, Luca da Penna, Luca De Penna; c. 1325 – c. 1390), 14th-century Neapolitan jurist and judge
- Phil Penna (1857–1939), American labor leader
- Roberto Penna (1857–1939), Italian athlete
- Sandro Penna (1906, Perugia – 1977, Rome), Italian poet
- Tati Penna (1960–2021), Chilean singer, journalist and television personality
- Toney G. Penna (1908–1995), Italian-American professional golfer
- Vinnie Penna, voice actor

== See also ==
- Della Penna, an Italian and Spanish language surname
