= Sakala =

Sakala may refer to:

== Places ==
- Sagala or Sakala, Sagala or Sangala, the ancient Greek name for a city of ancient India, the modern city of Sialkot in present-day Pakistan
- Sakala County, an ancient county in Estonia (nowadays for the most part Viljandi County)
- Sakala, Nepal, a city in Nepal

== Other ==
- Sakala (academic corporation), an Estonian academic corporation
- Sakala (newspaper), an Estonian newspaper
- Sakala (surname)
- EML Sakala (M314), a Sandown-class minehunter of the Estonian Navy
- Sakala Services Act, Karnataka

== See also ==
- Sagala (disambiguation)
- Shakal (disambiguation)
- Sialkot (disambiguation)
