= Army of Germany =

Army of Germany or Armée d'Allemagne may refer to:

- Army of Germany (1797), a French field army
- Army of Germany (1809), a French field army

== See also ==
- German Army (disambiguation)
