= Chehra =

Chehra (lit. 'face') may refer to:

- Chehra (1946 film), an Indian film
- Chehraa (1999 film), an Indian film
- Chehraa, a 2005 Indian film
- Chehra (2013 film), a 2013 Indian film
- Chehra (TV series), Indian television series aired in 2009

== See also ==
- Shakal (disambiguation)
