= Sagala (disambiguation) =

Sagala was a city in ancient India (modern-day Sialkot, Pakistan).

Sagala may also refer to:

== People ==
- Sagala Ratnayaka (born 1968), Sri Lankan politician
- Salmon Sagala (1931–2001), Toba Bataknese politician
- Valentina Sagala, Indonesian women's rights activist

== Other uses ==
- Sagala, Mali, village in Mali
- Sagala language

== See also ==
- Sakala (disambiguation)
- Shakal (disambiguation)
- Sialkot (disambiguation)
