= Sialkot (disambiguation) =

Sialkot is a city in Punjab, Pakistan.

Sialkot may also refer to:

== Places ==
- Sialkot District, a district of Punjab, Pakistan
- Sialkot Tehsil, a tehsil of Sialkot district
- Sialkot Fort, a fort in Pakistan
- Sialkot Cantonment, a cantonment in Pakistan
- Sialkot International Airport, an airport in Pakistan
- Sialkot Junction railway station, a railway station in Pakistan
- Sialkot, Mansehra, a village in Mansehra district, Pakistan

== See also ==
- Sial (disambiguation)
- Kot (disambiguation)
- Sagala (disambiguation)
- Sakala (disambiguation)
- Shakal (disambiguation)
- Battle of Sialkot (disambiguation)
- Sialkot cricket team, a local domestic team
- Sialkot Stallions, a cricket team
