= Penna =

Penna may refer to:

- 7mm Penna, a handgun cartridge
- Monte Penna, a mountain in northern Italy
- Penna (surname)
- Penna, Tasmania, a suburb of Hobart, Tasmania, Australia
- Penna in Teverina, a comune in Terni, Umbria, Italy
- Penna River, a river of southern India
- Penna., an abbreviation for Pennsylvania
- Penda of Mercia, king of Mercia, who is sometimes called Penna of Mercia.

== See also ==
- Della Penna, a surname
