= German Army (band) =

American experimental musical group

- Also known as: GeAr; Ralf K. German; Germ Class; German; PK; Paul Kneejie
- Origin: Los Angeles, CA, USA
- Genres: Experimental; drone; neo-psychedelia; industrial
- Years active: 2011–present
- Labels: Kill Shaman; Skrot Up; Opal Tapes; Muzan Editions; Tandem Tapes; Discrepant; Tabs Out; Yerevan Tapes; Phinery Tapes; A Giant Fern; Chondritic Sound; Hobo Cult Records; etc.
- Members: Peter Kris, Norm Heston
- Past members: Chin Genie; Greg Toumassian; Meatball Maker

German Army is an experimental musical act from California centered around an American artist using the pseudonym Peter Kris (PK). Together with bandmate Norm Heston (NH), they release music prolifically and almost exclusively as small runs on boutique cassette tape labels. The group's variable sound is heavily reliant on analog electronic processing, particularly delay effects.

== History ==
In 2003, Kris had co-founded the drone rock band Expo '70 together with his friend (and guitarist for Living Science Foundation), Justin Wright, while improvising together during a recording session in Los Angeles of Kris's noise rock project, SXBRS. The recordings were released together as a split CDR on Kris's label, Kill Shaman, and two shows were played live (with Parts & Labor and Tyondai Braxton, respectively). After creating another improvisational studio recording, Live July 18, 2004, creative differences arose regarding touring preferences, and PK began recording instead as German Army.

Earlier recordings were produced together with two friends, Chin Genie and Meatball Maker, who ultimately had a falling out together, leaving PK to prefer recording alone. PK nevertheless considers NH, who also goes by GT, as his bandmate and tries to include him whenever possible. NH contributes drum programming and keyboards, as well as helping to repair pedals and providing the more vintage equipment, having collected drum machines and keyboards since high school. PK considers as essential to the band.

Regarding their focus on the cassette medium (over 90% of their 80+ releases, as of 2020) PK has commented: "Cassette is simply the format to experiment on. I wouldn’t expect any label to release all these records on vinyl. At this point there is simply too much material to even begin with."

Music released under the name Peter Kris is reserved for more guitar-centric work, while German Army remains the outlet for beat-driven exotica and effects-driven experimental work.

The band uses pseudonyms to maintain separation between their artistic and vocational lives, as PK is an educator at an institution (presumably in Southern California), occasionally teaching history of U.S. foreign policy. Parallels have been drawn with the seminal, elusive avant-garde experimental rock band, The Residents.

== Themes ==
The titles and themes of the releases often highlight indigenous cultures and their anti-colonial struggles with western nations—for example, internment of Japanese Americans in No No Boys (referencing the 1957 novel by John Okada), US military presence in Puerto Rico in Vieques, and American Indian resistance in Mangas Coloradas (named for the Apache chief, "Red Sleeves").

Many song titles also represent diverse regions, languages, and peoples from around the world. For example, "Wakhan Corridor" references the Wakhan, a rugged, mountainous area of Afghanistan; "Mzab" refers to the M'zab Valleyregion of Algeria; and "Kabyle" references a Berber ethnic group living in the Atlas Mountains in Northern Algeria. Many songs reference Bantu languages from Angola: "Kikongo", "Nganguela" (also known as Luchazi), "Umbundu", "Nhaneca", and "Chokwe".

== Personnel ==
- Peter Kris (PK): percussion, voice, sampling, synthesizer, guitar, etc.
- Norm Heston (NH): beat sequencing, keyboards

== Discography ==
=== Studio albums ===
- 2020 Hearing Lola Kiepja (Eastern Nurseries)
- 2020 Animals Remember Human (Crash Symbols, Artetetra)
- 2020 A Geography Of Memory (No Problema Tapes, Hollow Point One)
- 2020 Blending Landscapes (Soil Records)
- 2020 The Chronology of the Base Nation (OSM tapes)
- 2019 No No Boy (Phormix Tapes)
- 2019 Out of the Past (SUBSIST)
- 2019 Reset Personality (Faith Disciplines)
- 2019 Year Of Solitude (Castle Bravo)
- 2019 Split with Savage Cult (NEN Records)
- 2019 Salary Of Stagnation (Cønjuntø Vacíø)
- 2018 Terroir Place (Genot Centre)
- 2018 Nepumoceno Cortina (Cloister Recordings)
- 2018 Vieques (Madriguera)
- 2018 Mangas Coloradas (Muzan Editions)
- 2018 More Bitter Fruit (Discrepant)
- 2018 MOVE9 (Fort Evil Fruit)
- 2018 Kowloon Walled City (\\NULL|ZØNE//)
- 2018 Wakhan Corridor (Old Captain)
- 2017 Insular Transcript (Reue Um Reue)
- 2017 Pyura Chilensis (Luce Sia)
- 2017 OCOTILLO (URUBU)
- 2017 Blue Green Depth (III Arms)
- 2017 Concrete Colored Paint (Several Minor Promises)
- 2017 Pacific Plastic (Seagrave)
- 2017 Swidden (Total Black)
- 2017 Tewa (Aught Void)
- 2017 Kurgan Hearth (OTA)
- 2017 Split with Bloque Del Sur (Pakapi Records)
- 2016 Tanna (Cønjuntø Vacíø)
- 2016 Virunga (Summer Isle)
- 2016 FUNAI (Kikimora Tapes)
- 2016 Split with Bary Center (Tandem Tapes)
- 2016 Worthless Spectrum (Cønjuntø Vacíø)
- 2016 Diego Garcia (Wounded Knife)
- 2016 Yanomami (Sacred Phrases)
- 2016 Fermin (NEN Records)
- 2016 Mountain City (Phinery Tapes)
- 2016 Disquiet (Discrepant)
- 2016 Te Ano (Opal Tapes)
- 2015 Tokodede (Tabs Out)
- 2015 Kalash Tirich Mir (Yerevan Tapes)
- 2015 Chigwe (Fort Evil Fruit)
- 2015 Clan Chieftains (Handmade Birds)
- 2015 Remain in Exile (Golden Cloud Tapes)
- 2015 Preserving Senses (Opal Tapes)
- 2015 Of Babongo (Discrepant)
- 2014 Jivaro Witnesses (Burka For Everybody)
- 2014 German Army (Trapdoor Tapes)
- 2014 Barrineans (Lava Church Records)
- 2014 Pennantia (905 Tapes)
- 2014 T'rung (Lighten Up Sounds)
- 2014 Millerite Masai (Yerevan Tapes)
- 2014 Socotra Scripture (Horror Fiction Tapes)
- 2014 Social Catalyst (Jozik Records)
- 2013 Last Language (A Giant Fern)
- 2013 Burushaski (Beläten)
- 2013 Former Prison (SixSixSixties Records)
- 2013 German Army (Skrot Up)
- 2013 Holland Village (Dub Ditch Picnic)
- 2013 Endless Phonics (Monofonus Press)
- 2012 Tarsier (Nute Records)
- 2012 Hoatzin (No Kings)
- 2012 Youtan Poluo (Chondritic Sound)
- 2012 Sedentary (Hobo Cult Records)
- 2012 Parte Do Corpo (Electric Voice Records)
- 2012 Cattle Border (Clan Destine Records)
- 2011 Papua Mass (Night People)
- 2011 Turkish Bath (Kill Shaman, AMDISCS)
- 2011 Body Linguist (Skrot Up)

=== Compilations ===
- 2020 A Case Study in Neglect (Dub Ditch Picnic, CD)
- 2017 Diaspora Of Intolerance (Dub Ditch Picnic, 2xCD)
- 2016 Video Archive (Castle Bravo, VHS)
- 2015 In Transit (Dub Ditch Picnic, CD)
- 2012 Extract Character Flaw (Family Time Records, 2xCDr)

=== Singles and EPs ===
- 2018 Bury in Amnesia (Nostalgie De La Boue)
- 2016 Quem Quaeritis (Faith Disciplines)
- 2016 Gone in Luxury (Altered States Tapes)
- 2015 Split with Nový Svět (Tourette Records)
- 2015 Taushiro (Weird Ear)
- 2015 Culp Valley (Castle Bravo)
- 2014 Cargo Circuits (A.C.T.I.O.N.)
- 2014 Tassili Plateau (Field Hymns)
- 2011 Dryr (AMDISCS)
