= Della Penna =

Della Penna is an Italian language and Spanish language surname. Notable people with the surname include:

- Claudio Della Penna (born 1989), Italian footballer
- Dolores Della Penna (died 1972), American murder victim
- Francesco della Penna (1680–1745), Capuchin missionary

== See also ==
- Penna (surname)
