= Pannalal =

Pannalal may refer to

- Pannalal Barupal, Indian politician
- Pannalal Bhattacharya, Bengali singer
- Pannalal Bose, Indian judge
- Pannalal Ghosh, Bengali musician
- Pannalal Jain, Jain scholar.
- Pannalal Patel, Gujarati author
- Pannalal Girdharlal Dayanand Anglo Vedic College, College in Delhi
- Heeralaal Pannalal (disambiguation)

== See also ==
- Panna (disambiguation)
- Lal (disambiguation)
