= De Heer =

De Heer is a Dutch surname, meaning 'the gentleman/lord'. The variant forms d'Heer and De Heere are now (nearly) extinct in the Netherlands.

People with the name include:

== De Heer ==
- Jack de Heer (born 1953), Canadian-born Dutch ice hockey player
- Jacqueline de Heer (born 1970), Dutch softball player
- Klaas de Heer (1829–1904), Dutch checkers and chess player
- Margaretha de Heer (1603–1665), Dutch painter
- Rolf de Heer (born 1951), Dutch-born Australian film director
- Walter de Heer (born 1949), Dutch experimental physicist

== De Heere ==
- Gerrit de Heere (1657–1702), Dutch Governor of Ceylon
- Lucas de Heere or Lucas 'd'Heere (1534–1584), Flemish portrait painter, poet and writer

== See also ==
- Heer (surname)
