= Heer Sial =

Heer Sial may refer to:

- Heer Sial, the titular character of the Punjabi folktale Heer Ranjha, best known from the poetic rendition by Sufi poet Waris Shah
- Heer Sial (1938 film), a 1938 Indian Punjabi-language film
- Heer Sial (1965 film), a Pakistan Punjabi-language film

== See also ==
- Heer Ranjha (disambiguation)
- Heer (disambiguation)
- Sial (disambiguation)
