= Heer Ranjha (disambiguation) =

Heer Ranjha is classical Punjabi folk tragedy.

Heer Ranjha may also refer to:

- Heer Ranjha (1928 film), an Indian silent film by Fatma Begum
- Heer Ranjha (1932 film), an Indian Punjabi-language feature film by A. R. Kardar
- Heer Raanjha, a 1970 Indian Hindi-language film
- Heer Ranjha (1970 film), a Pakistani Punjabi-language film
- Heer Ranjha (1992 film), an Indian Hindi-language film
- Heer Ranjha (TV series), a 2013 Pakistani romance drama television series

== See also ==
- Heer (disambiguation)
- Ranjha (disambiguation)
- Heer Sial (disambiguation)
