= Shakal =

Shakal (lit. 'face') may refer to

- Shakal Sandhya, a 2005 Indian Bengali-language film
- Shakal Pe Mat Ja, a 2011 Indian Hindi-language film
- Ram Shakal, Indian politician
- Shakaal, the fictional villain portrayed by Kulbhushan Kharbanda in the 1980 Indian film Shaan
- Shakaal, a fictional villain played by Ajit Khan in the 1973 Indian film Yaadon Ki Baaraat

== See also ==
- Chehra (disambiguation)
- Sakala (disambiguation)
- Sagala (disambiguation)
- Sialkot (disambiguation)
