= Prajna =

Prajna or Prajñā may refer to:

- Prajñā (Hinduism), a Hindu concept
- Prajñā (Buddhism), a Buddhist concept
- Prajna (Buddhist monk), an important 9th century Buddhist monk from Kapisa

== See also ==
- Panna (disambiguation)
- Prajnaparamita, a Buddhist concept
