= Battle of Sialkot =

Battle of Sialkot may refer to these battles in Sialkot:

- Battle of Sialkot (1761), during the Afghan–Sikh Wars
- Battle of Sialkot (1763), during the Afghan–Sikh Wars
- Battle of Chawinda (1965), at Chawinda in Sialkot District, part of the Indo–Pakistani War of 1965
- Attacks near Icchogil Canal, at Bambawali-Ravi-Bedian Canal (or Icchogil Canal) partly in Sialkot District, during the Indo–Pakistani War of 1965
- Battle of Ichogil Bund, at Bambawali-Ravi-Bedian Canal (or Ichogil Bund) partly in Sialkot District, during the Indo–Pakistani War of 1965

== See also ==
- Sialkot (disambiguation)
