= Sakala (surname) =

Sakala is a surname with multiple origins, including Slavic and Baltic countries in Eastern Europe and Zambia. Notable people with the surname include:

- Alcides Sakala Simões (born 1953), Angolan politician
- Benson Sakala (born 1996), Zambian footballer
- Christina Sakala (born 1993), Zambian model
- Evans Sakala (born 1970), Zambian footballer
- Fashion Sakala (born 1997), Zambian footballer
- Filip Sakala (born 1996), Czech ski jumper
- Henry Joe Sakala, Zambian actor and filmmaker
- Jaroslav Sakala (born 1969), Czech ski jumper
- Saith Sakala (born 1996), Zambian footballer
- Thomas Zondo Sakala (born 1955), Zimbabwean economist
