= Ranjha =

Ranjha (or Ranjhan) may refer to:

- Ranjha, the hero of Heer Ranjha, one of several popular tragic romances of Punjab
- "Ranjha", a 2021 song by Jasleen Royal and B Praak from the 2021 Indian film Shershaah
- "Ranjha", a 2026 song by Diljit Dosanjh, Sia and David Guetta
- Ranjha (clan), one of the clans of Jat people in Punjab
- Hafiz Barkhurdar Ranjha, renowned Punjabi sufi poet
- Khalid Mahmood Ranjha, member of the provincial assembly of Punjab
- Khalid Ranjha, former Pakistani law minister
- Mian Manazir Hussain Ranjha, MPA former Provincial Minister and Deputy Speaker Punjab
- Mohsin Shahnawaz Ranjha, member of the National Assembly of Pakistan
- Jamila Ranjha, the female Indian student in Mind Your Language, played by Jamila Massey
- Ranjha, a 2026 album by Shye Ben Tzur, Jonny Greenwood and the Rajasthan Express
- Kot Ranjha, a village in Punjab, India

== See also ==
- Ranjhan Mera Yaar, 1984 Indian film
- Ranjha Refugee, 2018 Indian film
- Heer Ranjha (disambiguation)
- Heer (disambiguation)
- Ranjana (disambiguation)
