= Hira (given name) =

- Gender: Unisex

Origin
- Origin: Sanskrit, India, Pakistan, Māori
- Meaning: Diamond (in Sanskrit)
- Region of origin: South Asia

Other names
- Variant form: Hiro
- Related names: Heer, Hero

Hira or Heera is a given name of South Asian (Indian, Pakistani) and Māori origin. It is a unisex name in India and Pakistan though more associated with women. It is a masculine name in Māori. The Sanskrit word hīrā has several meanings, one of which is "diamond".

== Given name ==
- Hira Chandra KC
- Hira Devi Waiba
- Hira Gurung
- Hira Lal (skier)
- Hira Lal Atal
- Hira Lal Devpura
- Hira Lall Sibal
- Hira Mani
- Hira Singh Bisht
- Hira Singh Dard
- Hira Singh Gabria
- Hira Singh Khatri
- Hira Singh Nabha
- Hira Solanki
- Hira Tareen
- Hira Te Popo
- Hira Vallabh Tripathi
- Heera Pathak, Gujarati poet and literary critic
- Heera Rajagopal, Indian actress
- Heera Saraniya, Indian politician
- Heera Singh Sandhu, 18th-century Sikh leader

== See also ==
- List of names derived from gemstones
- Heer (disambiguation)
- Heera (disambiguation)
- Hera (disambiguation)
