= Panha =

Panha can refer to:

- PANHA, an Iranian helicopter manufacturing company
- Milinda Panha (lit. 'Menander's Question'), an early Indian Buddhist text in the form of a question and answer between king Menander I and monk Nagasena
- Aam panna, an Indian mango drink

== See also ==
- Panna (disambiguation)
