= German Army (disambiguation) =

The German Army is the land component of the armed forces of Germany and previously West Germany.

German Army may also refer to:

- Land Forces of the National People's Army (1956–1990), the army of East Germany
- German Army (Wehrmacht), the army of Nazi Germany
- Reichsheer, land component of the Reichswehr (1919–1935), the armed forces of the Weimar Republic
- Imperial German Army (1871–1919), the army of the German Empire
- Army of the Holy Roman Empire (1422–1806), the army of the Holy Roman Empire of the German Nation
- Imperial Army of the Holy Roman Emperor, the private army of the Holy Roman Emperor
- German Army (band), an experimental music act from California

== See also ==
- German Legion (disambiguation), sometimes called "German Army"
- Heer (disambiguation), the German term for land army
