= Mauro Tuena =

Swiss politician (born 1972)

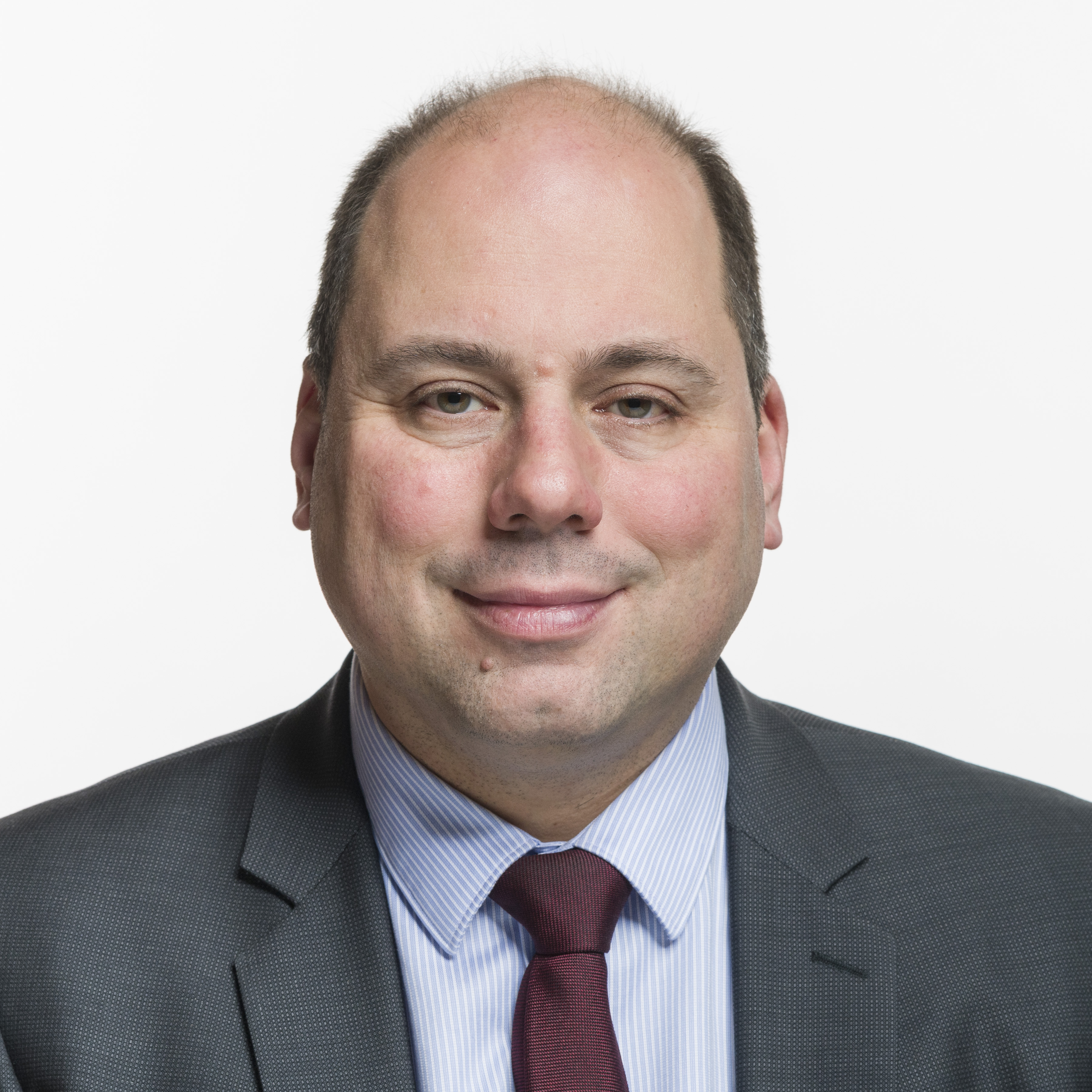
- Official portrait, 2019

Member of the National Council (Switzerland)
- Incumbent
- Assumed office 30 November 2015
- Constituency: Canton of Zürich

Personal details
- Born: Mauro Tuena; 25 January 1972 (age 54) Zürich, Zürich, Switzerland
- Party: Swiss People's Party
- Occupation: Businessman, computer technician, politician
- Website: Official website

Mauro Tuena (/tuːənɑː/ tu-ee-nah Italian pronunciation: [ˈmauro ˈtweːna] born 25 January 1972) is a Swiss businessman and politician. He currently serves as a member of the National Council (Switzerland) for the Swiss People's Party since 2015. Since 2020, Tuena is a member of the NATO Parliamentary Assembly. He previously served a brief period on the Cantonal Council of Zürich in 2015.

== Early life and education ==
Tuena was born on 25 January 1972 in Zürich, Switzerland. His family originally hailed from Poschiavo in the Italian-speaking region of Grisons. He was raised in Aussersihl and attended the local schools. He completed an apprenticeship to become a computer technician.

== Career ==
Tuena currently is a partner of C and E GmbH (C and E, LLC) together with his party ally and fellow politician Alfred Heer, a company which primarily is active in IT and computer/software trading. In 2010, when Tuena was a candidate for Council of States (Switzerland), he was allegedly involved in secretive financial operations. According to media information, Tuena has not disclosed that he was the controlling shareholder of Gut Gross & Partner Ltd. (GGP), which was accused of selling financial products with high risk investments. He declined the accusations.

== Politics ==
Since 1991, Tuena has been a member of the Young SVP in Zürich. Between April 1998 and November 2015 he served in the legislature of the city of Zürich (municipal council), where he chaired the social commission from 2004 to 2006. Between May and November 2015, Tuena served a brief period in the Cantonal Council of Zürich, where he was a member of the commission for energy, traffic and environment (KEVU). Tuena was elected to National Council (Switzerland) in the 2015 Swiss federal election assuming office on 30 November 2015. As of 2023, he is a member of the following commissions; safety political, education and culture as well as environment, urban studies and energy. Between 2016 and 2022, he was the president of the Swiss People's Party in Zürich.

== Personal life ==
Tuena resides in Zürich.
