= Hera (disambiguation) =

Hera is a Greek goddess.

Hera or HERA may also refer to:

== People ==
- Hera, full name Hera Hjartardóttir, an Icelandic/New Zealand singer-songwriter
- Hera Björk (born 1972), Icelandic singer
- Hera Hoffer, an American drag queen best known under the stage name Jinkx Monsoon
- Hera (wrestler), second-generation luchadora for Consejo Mundial de Lucha Libre

=== Characters ===
- Hera (Marvel Comics), a Marvel Comics character
- Hera, the superhero codename of Pepper Potts
- Hera Syndulla, a Star Wars character featured in Star Wars Rebels

== Biology ==
- Hera (plant), a genus of plants in the family Araceae

== Astronomy ==
- Hera (space mission)
- 103 Hera, an asteroid
- 1 Ceres, briefly bore the name Hera
- Elara (moon), a moon of Jupiter informally known as Hera from 1955 to 1975
- Hydrogen Epoch of Reionization Array (usually called HERA) a radio telescope in South Africa

== Places ==
- Heraeum (city of Hera), ancient Greek city
- Hieria, derives from Heraion akron (Greek: Ἡραῖον ἄκρον, "Cape of Hera"), ancient Greek city

== Other ==
- Hera (barquentine), a ship that sank in 1914
- Hera (painting), painting by Fabritius c. 1643
- HERA (particle accelerator)
- Hera (rocket)
- Hera, Iran, a village
- Hera (space mission), a European spacecraft, part of the AIDA mission
- The Higher Education and Research Act 2017, an act of the UK Parliament
- The Housing and Economic Recovery Act of 2008, an act of the US Congress
- Hera, the Zimbabwean musical instrument also known as matepe
- Hera Group, a multiutility company in Italy
- Hera Gallery, artist cooperative in Rhode Island, USA
- Mac OS X Server 1.0, codenamed "Hera" during production
- Health Emergency Preparedness and Response Authority, abbreviated as HERA
