= 39th District corruption scandal =

Philadelphia Police Department corruption and brutality scandal

The 39th District Corruption Scandal refers to a persistent pattern of brutality and corruption among a cadre of Philadelphia Police Department officers, primarily from the Department's 39th District. The scandal emerged in late 1995 and received nationwide attention by 1997, eventually resulting in an investigation by Human Rights Watch. Hundreds of people were involved in the incidents that occurred in North Philadelphia in the early 1990s. Some individuals are notable due to their direct participation, and others for their participation in related events, particularly the legal proceedings of the conviction of Mumia Abu-Jamal for the murder of Officer Daniel Faulkner.

== Police misconduct and civil rights violations ==
According to the Washington Post, police brutality within the district was "particularly present under the leadership of Frank Rizzo", and the district had "a long history of periodic scandals and corruption cases, as well as a reputation for police brutality." The core of the scandal involved actions by a group of Philadelphia police officers, some of whom were known to North Philadelphia as the Four Horsemen of the Apocalypse. These officers were charged with investigating suspected crack houses and drug distribution hubs. The officers conducted "raids" which were often unreported. In some of these locations the officers were also known for stealing from suspects and were described by one of the prosecuting judges as "squash[ing] the Bill of Rights into the mud.".

Three of the involved officers were dismissed from the department in 1991 for searching a known drug dealer's suburban apartment without a warrant. This dismissal was based on information provided by Pamela Jenkins, a prostitute and drug user who was the longtime girlfriend and informant of Officer Thomas Ryan. One of the dismissed officers, Sergeant Thomas DeGovanni, was reinstated a year later, while another officer, John Baird, was in arbitration for reinstatement. The third dismissed officer, Thomas Ryan, was awarded a full disability pension by the city board of pensions.

The investigation into the illegal search was ultimately turned over to the FBI by the Philadelphia Police Department Internal Affairs Bureau at the direction of Police Commissioner Willie Williams, in the wake of the beating of Rodney King by the Los Angeles Police Department. Many high-ranking command officers saw this as a political move on the part of Commissioner Williams, who then actively campaigned for the position of Chief of the Los Angeles Police Department.

The FBI carried the investigation as a low priority, assigning it to a rookie agent, James Williamson, as the first criminal investigation he headed. Williamson's investigation was stalled with no reliable witnesses or evidence to indict the 39th District, 5 Squad officers until Philadelphia Police Detective, James Dambach, was detailed to the FBI to assist Agent Williamson. By the summer of 1994 they had acquired enough circumstantial evidence of civil rights violations to approach former officer Thomas Ryan.

Ryan agreed to cooperate and turned over his informant and lover Pamela Jenkins to Detective Dambach and Agent Williamson. Ryan and Jenkins both agreed to wear body wires and to record their conversations with former officer Baird. In December 1994, Detective Dambach and Agent Williamson confronted Baird with the recordings made by Ryan and Jenkins. Baird, facing a long prison sentence if convicted, agreed to cooperate but was eventually charged and pled guilty to obstruction of justice for lying to a federal agent in a failed attempt to steer the investigation away from specific police officers who the Feds had targeted for indictment.

The federal investigation of the Philadelphia Police eventually expanded into the elite Highway Patrol Unit when Officer James Ryan (unrelated to Thomas Ryan) agreed to cooperate against the officers in that unit who engaged in the same activities as the officers in the 39th District.

In the wake of the scandal, nearly 1,400 cases were put under review; by 1997, between 160 and 300 had been overturned, leading to the release of more than 100 persons. Beyond the convictions obtained by federal prosecutors, no one in the Philadelphia Police Detective was explicitly punished, other than being transferred to other units within the department, with the exception of Philadelphia Police Detective James Dambach, who upon returning to regular police duties found himself to be a pariah within the ranks. Labelled a "Gink" (Philadelphia police term for rat), Dambach endured the label and eventually attained the rank of lieutenant.

=== Convicted PPD officers ===
The following members of the Philadelphia Police Detective's Special Narcotics Unit, also known as The Five Squad, were convicted:

- Officer John Baird
- Lt. Frank Dubundo
- Sergeant Thomas DeGovanni
- Officer Steven Brown
- Officer James Ryan
- Officer Thomas Ryan (police officer) (on leave from the PPD at the time of conviction).
- Officer Louis J. Maier, convicted on separate charges of robbery and battery.

=== Other key figures ===
- Ed Rendell, Mayor
- Lynne Abraham, District Attorney.
- Pamela Jenkins (informant), paid PPD informant and key government witness.
- James Dambach, Philadelphia Police detective credited with breaking loose the stalled federal investigation.
- James Williamson, FBI agent who headed the investigation of the 39th District 5 Squad.

== Aftermath ==
=== Raymond Carter trial ===
Raymond Carter achieved notoriety for being the subject of a murder case that arose in the aftermath of the corruption scandal, resulting in his release from prison on December 30, 1996. Key figures in his conviction (and release) were PPD officer Thomas Ryan and prostitute Pamela Jenkins, the latter of whom would come to play a role in a 1997 Post Conviction Review Act hearing regarding the more famous trial of Mumia Abu-Jamal.

Carter, a former heroin dealer, was sentenced in 1988 to life imprisonment for the slaying of Robert "Puppet" Harris, of North Gratz Street, at the Pike Bar in North Philadelphia on September 18, 1986. His conviction was secured largely on the testimony of Pamela Jenkins, who testified that she saw Carter pick up a gun and fire at Harris from a distance of about three feet.

Ten years later, as Ryan's reputation began to unravel after his conviction on a federal corruption charge related to the 39th district scandal, Jenkins came forward and asserted that she had been paid $500 by a group of PPD officers, including Ryan, to testify against Carter. This resulted in Common Pleas Court Judge Joseph I. Papalini throwing out Carter's first-degree murder conviction in late 1996, stating that it was simply impossible to determine whether Carter had killed Harris, and ordering a new trial.

The fact of Jenkins's reversal of testimony in the Raymond Carter case came to light during the PCRA appellate hearings in the Mumia Abu-Jamal case. In particular, in 1997, lawyers for Abu-Jamal produced an affidavit by Jenkins stating that while she was involved with Ryan in a casually sexual relationship 1981, Ryan had repeatedly pressured fellow prostitute Cynthia White to provide false testimony against Abu-Jamal. Jenkins claimed to have recently seen White in March of 1997. The prosecution was able to provide a death certificate for Cynthia White dated 1992, which they argued made Jenkins’ testimony invalid, and suggested Jenkins be charged with perjury. The defense was not able to provide evidence of White’s whereabouts, or present White to corroborate Jenkins’ testimony. The case was dismissed, and Abu-Jamal later fired his legal team.

== Bibliography ==
- Don Terry, "Philadelphia shaken by criminal police officers," New York Times, August 28, 1995.
- Michael Kramer, "How cops go bad," Time magazine, December 15, 1997.
- Mark Fazlollah, "From prison, ex-cops call offenses routine," Philadelphia Inquirer, May 12, 1996.
- Mark Fazlollah, "Phila. ordered to report on police," Philadelphia Inquirer, March 28, 1997
- Christopher McDougall, "Law and Disorder," Philadelphia Weekly, June 18, 1997
- Interview with Brad Bridge, city public defender's office, August 20, 1996.
- McDougall, "Law and Disorder," Philadelphia Weekly.
- "Shielded from Justice: Philadelphia". Human Rights Watch.
- New Jersey Crime Line - Special Issue on Police Corruption
- Trampling the Public Trust: Philadelphia Police Abuses Reveal Systemic Injustice
