= Opal Tapes =

- Founded: 2012
- Founder: Stephen Bishop
- Genre: Techno, house music
- Country of origin: United Kingdom
- Location: Redcar
- Official website: opaltapes.bandcamp.com

Opal Tapes is an English independent record label that releases abstracted forms of house music, techno, and other types of electronic music. Founded by Stephen Bishop (who produces original music as "Basic House") in 2012 in the small town of Redcar in northeastern England, Opal Tapes is now based in Newcastle, UK. Opal Tapes is well known for releasing its music on cassettes in addition to more popular formats such as vinyl. In January 2013, electronic music magazine Resident Advisor named Opal Tapes its "Label of the Month."

== Opal Tapes Discography ==
Catalog	Artist	Title	Year
OPAL001	Tuff Sherm & PMM	The Pagan Theatre	2012
OPAL002	Personable	Alternate/Other	2012
OPAL003	Huerco S.	Untitled	2012
OPAL004	BAT & OND TON	BAT & OND TON	2012
OPAL005	1991	High-Tech High-Life	2012
OPAL006	Basic House	I'm Not A Heaven Man	2012
OPAL007	51717	0VUL	2012
OPAL008	Wanda Group	Piss Fell Out Like Sunlight	2012
OPAL009	MCMXCI	Skogen, Flickan Och Flaskan	2012
OPAL010	MCMXCI	Skogen, Flickan Och Flaskan (vinyl edition)	2012
OPAL011	DJ Ford Foster	Function Trax. Vol 2	2012
OPAL012	IVVVO	All Shades Of White	2012
OPAL013	Ex-Con	Manual De ForÁa I T‡ctica	2012
OPAL014	Traag	Confused In Reality	2012
OPAL015	Various Artists	Cold Holiday	2012
OPAL016	Uio Loi	Cane	2013
OPAL017	COIN	Stilled	2013
OPAL018	Lumigraph	Nautically Inclined	2013
OPAL019	HOLOVR	Lunar Lake	2013
OPAL020	Wanda Group	Piss Fell Out Like Sunlight (vinyl edition)	2013
OPAL021	Naka Naka	Juan Pestanas	2013
OPAL022	Nikolai	The Symbols and the Signs	2013
OPAL023	S Olbricht	Deutsch Amerikanische Tragödie	2013
OPAL024	Rejections	Resin In The Filter	2013
OPAL025	Yves De Mey	Metrics	2013
OPAL026	Shapednoise	Until Human Voices Wake Us	2013
OPAL027	PHORK	Privileged Life	2013
OPAL028	Bleaching Agent	Stride By Stride	2013
OPAL029	Karen Gwyer	Kiki The Wormhole	2013
OPAL030	Patricia	Body Issues	2013
OPAL031	OOBE	SFTCR	2013
OPAL032	Lumisokea	Apophenia	2014
OPAL033	Kaumwald	Hantasive	2014
OPAL034	Body Boys	Growth Window	2013
OPAL035	Lumisokea	Contrapasso	2013
OPAL036	Manse	Lying In Wait	2013
OPAL037	Dreamweapon	Living In Hell On Earth	2013
OPAL038	COIN	Inside Palace	2013
OPAL039	Austin Cesear & Stefan JÛs	We Live Here	2014
OPAL040	Ketev	Ketev	2014
OPAL041	James Place	An Entire Matchbook A Night	2014
OPAL042	Ford Foster & William Watts	FF & WW	2014
OPAL043	Alley Catss & S Olbricht	Alley Catss & S Olbricht	2014
OPAL044	D.Å.R.F.D.H.S.	Förintelsen & Döden	2014
OPAL045	Mike Simonetti	At the Juncture of Dark and Light Vol. 3	2014
OPAL046	Worker/Parasite	Proletariat E.P.	2014
OPAL047	Run Dust	Zeckenentferner	2014
OPAL048	Violetpoison	Sovrastrutture	2014
OPAL049	HOLOVR	Holo Earth	2014
OPAL050	Siobhan	Southgate	2014
OPAL051	Michael DeMaio	Half Cross	2015
OPAL052	Decimus	Maroboduus	2015
OPAL053	BAT	Form & Void	2015
OPAL054	D.Å.R.F.D.H.S.	Killing Is No Murder!	2015
OPAL055	Masks	Food Plus Drug (II)	2015
OPAL056	Ontario Hospital	Future Ready	2015
OPAL057	Gondwana	Aum	2015
OPAL058	Flores Del Vicio	Reach A Better Feeling	2015
OPAL059	Body Boys	No Face	2015
OPAL060	Michael Vallera	Distance	2015
OPAL061	Perfume Advert	+200 Gamma	2015
OPAL062	Russell E. L. Butler	God Is Change	2015
OPAL063	Cubic Space Collective	Dass II	2015
OPAL064	D.Å.R.F.D.H.S.	Leave Of Absence	2015
OPAL065	Lumisokea	Transmissions From Revarsavr	2015
OPAL066	Patricia	Bem Inventory	2015
OPAL067	Son Of	Social Zombies	2015
OPAL068	German Army	Preserving Senses	2015
OPAL069	Clouds	Sapporo NYE Crew (1995)	2015
OPAL070	Cremation Lily	Radiance And Instability	2015
OPAL071	Basic House & Metrist	The World Is Order, Incarnate	2015
OPAL072	Basic House	Cryptid Binaries	2015
OPAL073	Basic House	Caim In Bird Form	2015
OPAL074	$$$TAG$$$	Crowd Surfing	2016
OPAL075	Wanda Group	Central Heating	2016
OPAL076	Helm & Decimus	We Will Meet At Other Human Parties	2016
OPAL077	D. Glare	68 Samples At 68 BPM For Phased Heads	2016
OPAL078	CAO	Marginal Virgin	2016
OPAL079	Body Boys	Hood Spectrum	2016
OPAL080-X	Kaumwald	Rapa Nui Clan	2016
OPAL081	Pierrot Lunaire	Dog Chakra	2016
OPAL082	Gultskra Artikler	Industria	2016
OPAL083	Sote	Hardcore Sounds From Tehran	2016
OPAL084	Various Artists	U S S R (Ur Social Status Resistance)	2016
OPAL085	Your Planet Is Next	Virgo Moon	2016
OPAL086	Emra Grid	The Same Face	2016
OPAL087	E-Saggila	Old Orders Of Beauty	2016
OPAL088	YancityGurl	Shadow Medium	2016
OPAL089	Död	Muscle Trax	2016
OPAL090	Facialmess	The Onedin Line	2016
OPAL091	German Army	Te Ano	2016
OPAL092	XDCVR	Cold Slab	2016
OPAL093	Various	Contemporary Dance	2017
OPAL094	D. Glare	4 Oscillators & 130 Samples At 130 BPM	2017
OPAL095	Bronze Teeth	Artex (MiniAlbum)	2017
OPAL097	Domenico Crisci	Body Punishment	2017
OPAL098	Vargdöd	Brutal Disciplin (Album)	2017
OPAL099	Gondwana	Miccaotli	2017
OPAL100	Basic House	I Could Tell You But Then You Would Have To Be Destroyed By Me	2017
OPAL101	Basic House	Government	2016
OPAL102	R	Man Of War	2017
OPAL103	Gosheven	Leaper (Album)	2017
OPAL104	Finn McNicholas	Concrescence	2017
OPAL105	K. Reinshagen	Dominati Symbols	2017
OPAL108	Sote	Sacred Horror In Design	2017
OPAL109	Evitceles	Imperfect Charm	2017
OPAL110	Binary Digit	Acid Drop	2017
OPAL111	Hainbach	No Need For Rain	2017
OPAL112	E-Saggila	Lux Campaign	2017
OPAL114	Chafik Chennouf	Dual Aspect (EP)	2017
OPAL115	Various	The Harvest of a Quiet Eye	2018
OPAL116	Cosmin Nicolae	Semnal (Album)	2018
OPAL117	David Terry	Sorrow	2018
OPAL118	Acre	Hollow Body	2018
OPAL119	Shadows	Particles Of Life	2018
OPAL121	Yeah You	KHOT<	2018
OPAL122	Gosheven	Bivaq	2018
OPAL123	Hainbach	Songs For Coco (Album)	2018
OPAL124	N1L	山卂ㄒ乇尺 爪乇爪ㄖ尺ㄚ	2018
OPAL124-X	N1L	Water Memory (Remixed)	2018
OPAL125	Phork	No Afterlife	2018
OPAL126	Domiziano Maselli	Ashes (Album)	2018
OPAL128	Monotronique	Heat Absorber	2018
OPAL130	Chafik Chennouf & Katsunori Sawa	For The Mimics	2018
OPAL131	Angelo Harmsworth	Kompressor	2018
OPAL133	Sloth	Getting Ready For Christmas (It's About Malt Liquor)	2018
OPAL134	D.U.D.S	Not At All / A Different Stage Part II	2018
OPAL135	Emra Grid	From A Band Of Thoughts That Ended My Year	2018
OPAL136	D.U.D.S.	Immediate	2018
OPAL137	R.H.G.T.	Depersonalisation	2019
OPAL138	Selm	Kreise	2019
OPAL139	Siavash Amini & Matt Finney	Second Shift	2019
OPAL140	The Newcomer	Earth Motivation	2019
OPAL141	The Newcomer	Reality Used To Be A Friend Of Mine	2019
OPAL143	David Terry & Eye Spirit	The White Horse Of The Sun	2019
OPAL146	Död	Arbetets Ära	2019
OPAL147	Soft Issues	Soft Issues	2019
OPAL148	Evitceles	The Substance Of My Fantasies	2019
OPAL149	Katsunori Sawa	An Enlightenment Manual, Your Consciousness Of Truth	2019
OPAL150	Various Artists	Amateur Vampires	2019
OPAL151	Rerekat	Our Bones Are Dried Up	2019
OPAL152	SDEM	IIRC	2019
OPAL153	J E L L V A K O	INTEGRATION	2019
OPAL154	DJ BANDO	Xanbient Works Volume 1	2019
OPAL155	Purpura & Lacrima	New World In A Peaceful Death / Dust Sculptures	2019
OPAL156	VSCC	EMSGD	2019
OPAL157	New Sincerity	Fiberglass Pools	2019
OPAL158	Autumns	Pissing Away My Youth	2019
OPAL159	Filmmaker	Unregulated	2019
OPAL160	djb	"dood & verderf"	2019
OPAL161	Territorial Gobbing	Capitalist Art Is Cartoons Fucking	2019
OPAL162	øjeRum	Through The Archway Of Mouths	2019
OPAL163	The Subdermic	Trepidation Ladder	2019
OPAL164	VASE	Amos' Flat: Room 1 & 2	2019
OPAL165	Ptwiggs	Darkening of Light	2019
OPAL166	Lyubocha	RYYTMA	2019
OPAL167	Life's Track	Race Against Time	2020
OPAL168	Lucy Johnson	Soundtracks 2013 - 2019 Vol. 1	2020
OPAL169	Siavash Amini & Saåad	All Lanes Of Lilac Evening	2020
OPAL170	Body Improvement Calendar	Business Major	2020
OPAL171	J. Carter	Rejoice!	2020
OPAL172	Avril Spleen	Thumbs Cut	2020
OPAL173	P A E S E F E R T I L E	P A E S E F E R T I L E	2020
OPAL174	Lacrima	Candy	2020
OPAL175	Kazuma Kubota	Mind	2020
OPAL176	Jordan Edge & Navid Asghari	Anamnesis	2020
OPAL177	Thet Liturgiske Owäsendet	Det Var Folk Där Ute. Dom Är Borta Nu.	2020
OPAL178	Sugarstick & Xerox	Sugarstick & Xerox	2020
OPAL179	Sote	MOSCELS	2020
OPAL180	Maltash	Clown For A Cold Audience	2020
OPAL181	øjeRum	Selected Percussive Works 1998 - 2001 Vol. I	2020
OPAL182	Francisco López	1985	2020
OPAL183	Emra Grid	A System A Platform A Voiid	2020
OPAL184	Mondkopf	The Day He Lost It	2020
OPAL185	Lacrima	St. Petersburg	2020
OPAL186	øjeRum	Selected Percussive Works 1998 - 2001 Vol. II	2020
OPAL187	Attilio Novellino & Our Love Will Destroy The World	The Assault Of Heaven	2020
OPAL188	R.Y.N.	Relics (Collected Works 2003 - 2011)	2020
OPAL189	Autumns	You Are Now Listening To Autumns	2020
OPAL190	Nocturnerror	Last Seconds Of Resentment Required	2020
OPAL191	GOLPESAR	The Flesh Of The World	2020
OPAL192	brb>voicecoil	The Alms Of Guilt	2020
OPAL193	Posverdad Trax	The Neutral Sin	2020
OPAL194	Burning Pyre	United Angels	2020
OPAL195	Soft Issues	High Capacity Magazine	2020
OPAL196	Tegh	Emergent Errors	2020
OPAL197	OOBE	SFTCR 2	2020
OPAL198	Dominique	Liminal Space	2020
OPAL199	Selm	TiiiER / Post-Adrenaline	2020
OPAL201	Isserley	Hardcore	2020
OPAL202	Breather	Ceremonies Of Aporia	2020
OPAL203	SW1n-Hunter	Aliasing The Empty Face	2020
OPAL204	øjeRum	Selected Percussive Works 1998 - 2001 Vol. III	2020
OPAL205	Granite Mask	Time Elapsed	2021
OPAL206	Död	Just Död It	2021
OPAL207	Evitceles	Black Leaf	2021
OPAL208	Eating The Internet	For Parts or Not Working	2021
OPAL209	Abbrumer	Encina	2021
OPAL210	Folded Voices	ALL VELCRO	2021

== Black Opal Discography ==
Catalog	Artist	Title	Year
BOP001	Patricia	Body Issues	2014
BOP002	Cloudface	Untitled	2014
BOP003	Naka Naka	Mundo Harsh	2014
BOP004	Xosar	Let Go	2015
BOP005	Metrist	This Is For Sore Is Just There	2016
BOP006	Russell E. L. Butler	The First Step	2016
BOP007	Personable	Oyster	2016
BOP008	J. Albert	Small Room	2016
BOP009	Cop Envy	Total End	2016
BOP010	Clouds	DJ Ultra Greatsword	2016
BOP011	Annanan	New Wave of Nature	2016
BOP012	DJ S	Neva Done This Before	2016
BOP013	Sciahri	Quiet Witness	2017
BOP014	Persuasion	Quatermass EP	2018
BOP015	Lyubocha	Berzerk	2018
BOP016	Lyra Valenza	Scan, Deliver	2018
BOP017	Patricia	Heavy Merging	2019
BOP018	Domenico Crisci	Velvet	2019
BOPW001	J. Albert	Untitled	2015
BOPW002	Life's Track	The Smell Of Sanctity	2015
BOPW003	Nathan Melja	A.C.I.	2016
BOPW004	Sciahri	Behind The Line EP	2016
BOPW005	L Neils	Puzzlebox	2016

BOPW catalogue discontinued. All titles are now BOP whether single/EP/LP
