= Youth Empowerment for Advancement Hangout =

Community organization working with youth impacted by violence

- Abbreviation: YEAH Philly
- Founded: 2018; 8 years ago
- Founder: Kendra Van de Water; James Aye
- Type: 501(c)(3) non-profit organization
- Location: Philadelphia, Pennsylvania, U.S.
- Region served: Philadelphia
- Website: yeahphilly.org

Youth Empowerment for Advancement Hangout, also known as YEAH Philly, is a non-profit community organization based in Philadelphia, Pennsylvania, that works with teens and young adults who have been impacted by violence. It was founded in 2018 by Kendra Van de Water and James Aye as a Black-led organization in an effort to increase the voice of young people and decrease violence in Philadelphia. YEAH Philly describes itself as envisioning "a Philadelphia where teens and young adults lead the way in successfully resolving violent conflicts with bold and culturally relevant practices".

== History ==
After speaking with youth in the city about their needs, Van de Water and Aye initially focused on West and Southwest Philadelphia, running group sessions for youth at local recreation centers and libraries, where they would provide different workshops and therapy after school and in the evenings. The organization offered a holistic approach to assist its youth participants, helping them obtain their driver's licenses, attending school meetings with them, aiding their families with home repairs and utility bills, and providing clean clothes and meals. They expanded to offer paid work programs, employment and job skills initiatives, assistance with transportation, and peer mediation sessions, and also track disputes in the community and on social media to intervene before disputes lead to violence. The group emphasizes the importance of spending time in nature, such as fishing, canoeing, and going on hikes. During the COVID-19 pandemic, the organization continued in-person sessions after recognizing a need for youth who were spending too much time isolated in their homes.

Since 2020, YEAH Philly has hosted an annual "Healing in the Hood" basketball tournament for teens to honor those who have died from gun violence. In 2021, the tournament took place at the Kingsessing Recreation Center, which was chosen to allow young people to feel safe in an area that has dealt with gun violence. YEAH Philly previously held a series of Youth and Police groups where police officers would come and talk with the youth participants, and organized basketball and kickball games between youth teams and police officers to improve their relationships.

In October 2020, they announced they were ending their partnership with the Philadelphia Police Department after the killing of Walter Wallace by two officers. They had recently held a kickball tournament with police officers in the 19th district and local community leaders.

In 2020, YEAH Philly purchased a building in West Philadelphia through foundation grants, a GoFundMe fundraiser, and other donations. The building, located in an area that has dealt with both violence and gentrification, serves as a community center and includes a music studio, therapy rooms, and spaces for youth to stay safe during violent situations. After opening the building, the organization had to work with the neighborhood to change the perception of youth who have been involved in violence in the city. In 2021, they established a new program with funding from District Attorney of Philadelphia to help those released from juvenile detention centers.

In addition to its work with youth, YEAH Philly holds weekly community food giveaways, providing items such as fresh fruits and vegetables and pet food. In 2021, the organization partnered with another non-profit to provide free gun locks to residents during its food giveaways.
