= Eddie Polec murder case =

1994 case in Philadelphia, Pennsylvania

The Eddie Polec murder case centers on the murder of a 16-year-old Edward William Polec that took place on the front steps of St. Cecilia's church in the Philadelphia Fox Chase neighborhood on the night of Friday, November 11, 1994. The case drew national media attention because it happened in a middle-class residential part of the city not customarily known for such a crime. Adding to its controversy was that it was carried out by a band of mixed-race youth from neighboring Montgomery County's upscale suburban Abington Township. The Philadelphia 911 emergency phone service and the Philadelphia police were reported to have been extraordinarily slow in responding that night.

== Inciting incident ==
The murder of Eddie Polec was the result of minor hostilities that had developed between Fox Chase youths and a young female from Abington Township the week before, outside a Fox Chase McDonald's Restaurant. A group of Fox Chase teenagers were alleged to have upset the girl by tossing a plastic cup of soda into her car. This much was later admitted to by the Fox Chase youth. However, when word of the incident got back to Abington Township, it grew out of proportion to include a false rumor that she had been raped in the McDonald's parking lot. In response, a group of Abington teenagers decided to retaliate on her behalf in conjunction with a warning she had allegedly made the night of the initial incident just before departing Fox Chase: "You're all getting [expletive] beat up next weekend".

According to witnesses, she was seen again in Fox Chase early the following Friday night driving the same vehicle, this time along with Abington youths in another car; the passengers of both cars making threats similar to the one she had made the week before. Both vehicles then departed Fox Chase, and at around 9:30 PM five carloads packed with other Abington teenagers arrived in their wake in what was described as a tightly formed caravan. It first stopped at a Fox Chase 7-Eleven store and, after taking over its parking lot, some of its passengers got out and demanded directions to the McDonald's. The one perceived to be the leader was overheard to say, "Come on, we have to do this. We have a job to get done. Let's do this before the police come." Before returning to their cars, he was witnessed jumping up and down shouting: "I'm so psyched, I could kill someone."

== Initial assaults ==
Just before 10:00 P.M. the caravan arrived at the McDonald's. Its passengers then jumped out and began chasing every Fox Chase youth they saw with broken-off hockey sticks and baseball bats. According to one account, they outnumbered the Fox Chase teenagers thirteen to two. They cornered one and began severely beating him with bats until his friends could pull him free. The Fox Chase teenagers then scattered, but the rampage spread out to encompass a much wider portion of Fox Chase.

Residents witnessing the melee overtaking their normally peaceful neighborhood began calling Philadelphia's 911 emergency response service in growing numbers, each caller expecting police to be sent out right away. Some callers described what looked to be as many as 40 to 50 kids shouting obscenities, smashing bottles, hurling rocks, and breaking car windows.

With no police patrol cars being dispatched, the caravan began racing recklessly throughout Fox Chase until finally zeroing in on one particular young male it saw near to the front steps of Saint Cecilia's Catholic Church, Eddie Polec, who had been waiting there to walk home with his younger brother. Eddie was then chased down by the succession of cars coming toward him. As the caravan sharply pulled into the church's parking lot, cutting him off while simultaneously blocking other Fox Chase youths from coming to his aid, he tried running farther, but the first passenger out threw a baseball bat at his legs causing him to fall. At that point, the Abington teenager and others began striking him with baseball bats as he lay on the ground pleading for his life. He was then stood up so that some in the group could take bat swings directly at his head. After suffering eight forceful blows to the head this way he was then dropped back to the pavement, at which point another, wearing steel-tipped boots, kicked him several times in the face. With that final assault, the assailants then quickly fled in their caravan and were said to have been laughing and high-fiving one another as it sped away. Authorities would later describe it as having been one of the most brutal murders in all Philadelphia history.

== Arrival of police ==
It was 45 minutes after the first 911 call was placed that police were finally dispatched to the scene. By then, Eddie Polec lay bloodied and unconscious on the steps of the church. He was immediately rushed to hospital. Despite medics' best efforts, the following morning Eddie Polec was pronounced dead.

It would later emerge that while Eddie's friends gathered in mourning outside the church where he had been killed the night before, four teenage girls from Abington who had been part of the caravan the night before, attended a party for a friend just a few blocks away from the church, seemingly unfazed by it.

== News coverage ==
The news coverage of Eddie Polec's murder quickly went national, with the failure on the part of Philadelphia's 911 operators receiving special emphasis, much of the blame being placed directly on them. Fox Chase residents and others had complained about them being insensitive and unresponsive, and even expressing resentment as the callers tried to make clear the matter's urgency.

The head of the union representing the operators stated that the reason for their questionable performance was that they had been working with outdated equipment, were underpaid, and had not been trained properly by the city.

Nonetheless, Philadelphia's Mayor Ed Rendell took immediate disciplinary action against them, saying, "Flaws in the system in no way, shape or form give anybody license to be abusive to citizens calling to report a crime." In their defence the operators soon after appeared on ABC's The Oprah Winfrey Show, where they tried to argue that they had done a good job that night. However, 911 tapes that had been released by the police were getting extensive airplay nationally by that point and they supported the callers' accusations. The 911 operators themselves, meanwhile, believed that because they were all African American they were being made political scapegoats. That claim was denounced by the president of Philadelphia's branch of the NAACP, Thornhill Cosby, who said: "This is not a racial issue. It is a human issue."

The 911 call handlers appealed the city's disciplinary action and were eventually exonerated. The mayor, in response to this tragedy, created a commission to explore ways the 911 system could be improved.

The investigation of Eddie Polec's murder led to the arrest of seven Abington teenagers, aged 16 to 18, with six of them charged with murder, and the seventh for supplying the bats used in the crime. All of them were found to have some school disciplinary records, in some instances for violent behavior, and one had been expelled for bringing a gun into school. Several of them were on probation for various offences.

Four of them were students at Abington High School, another had graduated from there, and two attended other schools. The investigation also revealed that many other youths from Abington had also been involved, though they were never charged. The reason why, it was argued, was to keep the case manageable, given the extraordinary extent of it. As one Philadelphia police officer put it, when youths from Abington were brought into Philadelphia's police headquarters for purposes of establishing witnesses they all acted like suspects. All the females were described as being defiantly untruthful while all the males showed no signs of sympathy towards the victim.

When the news emerged that teenagers from Abington were behind it, Abington declared the week "Nonviolent Conflict Resolution Week". Fellow students at Abington High School were reported to be in shock, having a great deal of difficulty comprehending how this crime could have originated from what they had perceived to be idyllic suburbia free of such types of behavior. The mother of one of the perpetrators, speaking on condition of anonymity, said, "These are suburban kids – you don't figure them to go bad. It's not their character to be a rough group of kids."

Nonetheless, the news media attacks on Abington's newly acquired bad image continued, with the Daily News in its front-page headline calling Abington High School "MURDER HIGH" alongside a graphic of the school's crest, with a subheading: "They're suspects in Fox Chase beating – and they're walking the halls in Abington." This particular report drew strong criticism from Eddie Polec's younger brother, who in a local TV news spot insisted it mischaracterized Abington kids as he knew them to be. The Polec family appeared on local television pleading for calm and to allow the courts to handle the matter. This plea on their part proved effective. Following it not a single retaliation attempt was reported, although news media attacks on Philadelphia's 911 system continued unabated. These criticisms grew so intense that they threatened to fully derail the mayoral administration of Ed Rendell, who up till then had been praised as a fast-rising star on the U.S. political stage and had been hailed as "America's Mayor" by The Wall Street Journal. In his defence he appeared on Larry King Live and other national broadcasts in efforts to distance himself from what he summarized as a defective carryover from previous administrations that he vowed to amend. Still, the bad publicity regarding Philadelphia's 911 system remained strong, with NBC-TV's Saturday Night Live doing a comedy sketch with Roseanne Arnold in the role of an indifferent Philadelphia 911 operator refusing to take any callers seriously.

As for Eddie Polec, he had been a well-liked high school senior with no apparent ties to the Fox Chase youth said to have initially sparked the hostilities. His popularity was such that when a memorial service for him was held at his church, his entire high school senior class was in attendance, the church itself was packed to near double capacity, and a thousand more people stood outside in the rain where a loudspeaker was set up so all could hear the service. At his viewing over four thousand people came, waiting in line for hours to pay last respects, and his funeral procession when traveling from the funeral home to the cemetery was reported to be a mile long.

== Murder trial ==
The Eddie Polec murder trial began on January 2, 1996, at the Philadelphia Criminal Justice Center with Judge Jane Cutler Greenspan of the Philadelphia Court of Common Pleas presiding. Joseph Patrick Casey of the Philadelphia district attorney's office served as the prosecuting attorney, and Angelo Charles Peruto, Sr., in addition to his personally representing one of the defendants, served as the lead defence attorney. Other defendants under his representation also had their personal defence attorneys. Famous for never having lost a murder case, and notorious for representing major Philadelphia organized crime figures, the Eddie Polec murder trial would prove to be one of Peruto's greatest challenges.

Another defendant, the grandson of a retired Philadelphia police officer, was not under Peruto's representation because he had struck a deal with the prosecution to be the star witness in exchange for leniency.

Before the trial got underway, although the defendants would be tried as adults, the Philadelphia's district attorney ruled out the death penalty because under Pennsylvania law there weren't enough aggravating circumstances to make it a capital offense. Instead, the prosecution sought convictions for first-degree-murder life sentences. This concurred with the position of the Polec family, who strongly opposed the death penalty on moral grounds.

Throughout the trial, all members of the Polec family were in attendance along with many others from the Fox Chase community. All the defendants, in the meantime, were allowed to freely walk around outside the courtroom and immediately outside the Criminal Justice Center whenever the trial was not in session. Oftentimes the Polec family and others from Fox Chase saw them in passing. Although one of the defendants turned violent in the courtroom hallway and had to be quickly restrained by a police detective, the practice was allowed to continue.

After several weeks of exposure to powerful arguments made by the prosecution, with graphic medical photos being shown of the extent of the brutality which Eddie Polec endured, countless witness testimonies, and arguments made by the defence team – which primarily questioned the validity of the star witness – and six days of deliberation, on February 5, 1996, at 5:00 P.M. the jury announced the verdict. It found three of the defendants guilty of third-degree murder and conspiracy, another of voluntary manslaughter and conspiracy, and two of conspiracy. As the Polec family exited the Criminal Justice Center following the announcement, the father of Eddie Polec told reporters that they accepted the verdict, although they didn't understand it.

Sentencing took place on March 19, 1996. Before sentencing began, the defendants were asked if they wanted to make any last statements. Only one agreed to, becoming the only defendant to express any remorse, to which the court responded by lessening his sentence. His maximum sentence of fifteen to thirty years for third-degree murder and conspiracy was reduced by six months. Of the other three defendants found guilty of the same charge, one received ten to twenty years for murder and a consecutive five to ten years for conspiracy, and the third was sentenced to fifteen to thirty years. The defendant found guilty of voluntary manslaughter and conspiracy received eight to twenty years, and the two found guilty of conspiracy were sentenced to five to ten years.

== Legacy ==
In the trial's aftermath, the father of Eddie Polec, through a determined letter-writing campaign and intense lobbying effort, tried to sway Pennsylvania's legislators to change how the law defined first-degree murder. Because some members of the defence team had made false and misleading statements during the trial, he hoped for a possible re-ruling. These efforts failed, and the Philadelphia District Attorney's office officially closed the case in September 1996. Soon after, he turned down the chance to sue the city for $50 million, instead ensuring that Philadelphia's Mayor Ed Rendell fulfilled his promise to upgrade the city's 911 system. In response to these efforts, in September 1998 Philadelphia officially dedicated its all-new 911 Emergency Communication Center, along with more intensive training for operators. The father of Eddie Polec became an in-demand speaker at church groups and high schools, and he did extensive voluntary work for the non-profit organization Lost Dreams on Canvas that commissions portraits of children who died violently.

The Eddie Polec murder case also spurred the formation of the Fox Chase Town Watch Association, with one of the first callers to Philadelphia's 911 system the night of the crime becoming its leader.

In 1999 the Los Angeles-based journalist team of Bryn Freedman (the official reporter who covered the Polec murder trial) and William Knoedelseder published a book titled In Eddie's Name: One Family's Triumph over Tragedy, which detailed the Polec family's experience, including in-depth insights about the murder, investigation, and trial.
