= Chehra (2013 film) =

- Directed by: Amit-Ashish & Deepak K Bajaj
- Produced by: Veena Bajaj
- Starring: Sheetal Pathak; Saheem Khan; Quaiser Jamal; Raza Murad; Sandesh Jadhav; Priyanka Gairola; Kumar Sunil; Gautam Berde; Satyapal Landge; Sunil Hirekhan; Rishika Bajaj
- Cinematography: Amit Dhapodkar & Ashsish Madke
- Edited by: Amit Dhapodkar & Ashish Madke
- Music by: Ashish A. Dhage, Background score-Aslam Keyi
- Distributed by: Gaarimma Films
- Release date: 26 April 2013
- Country: India
- Language: Hindi

Chehra is a 2013 Hindi Horror film directed by Amit-Ashish & Deepak K Bajaj and produced by Veena Bajaj & Deepak K Bajaj. The film features Sheetal Pathak, Saheem Khan and Quaiser Jamal as main characters.

== Cast ==
- Sheetal Pathak
- Saheem Khan
- Quaiser Jamal
- Raza Murad
- Sandesh Jadhav
- Priyanka Gairola
- Kumar Sunil
- Gautam Berde
- Satyapal Landge
- Sunil Hirekhan
- Rishika Bajaj
