= Hiralal Macchi =

Indian cricketer

Hiralal Macchi was an Indian cricketer who played for Gujarat.

Macchi made a single first-class appearance for the side, during the 1981–82 season, against Baroda. From the lower-middle order, he scored 2 runs in the first innings in which he batted, and a single run in the second.

Macchi bowled two overs in the match, conceding 9 runs.
