= Marie Noe =

American serial killer

- Born: Marie Lyddy; August 23, 1928; Philadelphia, Pennsylvania, U.S.
- Died: May 5, 2016 (aged 87); Philadelphia, Pennsylvania, U.S.
- Conviction: Second degree murder
- Penalty: 20 years probation

Details
- Victims: 8
- Country: United States
- State: Pennsylvania
- Date apprehended: 1998

Marie Noe (August 23, 1928 – May 5, 2016) was an American woman who was convicted in June 1999 of murdering eight of her children. Between 1949 and 1968, eight of the ten Noe children died of mysterious causes which were then attributed to sudden infant death syndrome. All eight children were healthy at birth and were developing normally. Two other children died of natural causes. Noe pleaded guilty in June 1999 to eight counts of second-degree murder, and was sentenced to 20 years' probation and psychiatric examination.

== Biography ==
=== Early life ===
Noe was born Marie Lyddy on August 23, 1928, in the Kensington neighborhood of Philadelphia to Ella (née Ackler) and James Lyddy. Marie was one of several children born of her parents' troubled marriage. Marie contracted scarlet fever at age five, which she later credited as the cause of learning difficulties. She dropped out of school as a young teenager to work and help care for a niece, born to one of her older sisters when Marie was 12 and raised as Marie's sister.

=== Marriage and children ===
Marie Lyddy and Arthur Allen Noe (1921–2009) met at a private club in the West Kensington neighborhood of Philadelphia. On June 1, 1948, after a brief courtship, the couple eloped. The couple proceeded to have ten children, all of whom died between the ages of five days and 14 months.

1. Richard Allan Noe (March 7, 1949 – April 7, 1949)
2. Elizabeth Mary Noe (September 8, 1950 – February 17, 1951)
3. Jacqueline Noe (April 23, 1952 – May 3, 1952)
4. Arthur Noe Jr. (April 23, 1955 – April 28, 1955)
5. Constance Noe (February 24, 1958 – March 20, 1958)
6. Letitia Noe (stillborn, August 24, 1959; cause of death was umbilical cord knot)
7. Mary Lee Noe (June 19, 1962 – January 4, 1963)
8. Theresa Noe (died in hospital, June 1963; cause of death was "congenital hemorrhagic diathesis")
9. Catherine Ellen Noe (December 3, 1964 – February 24, 1966)
10. Arthur Joseph Noe (July 28, 1967 – January 2, 1968)

During the Caesarean birth of her last child, Noe had a uterine rupture and underwent a hysterectomy.

In 1963 Life magazine published a sympathetic article on Noe, written by Mary Cadwalader and using the pseudonyms Martha and Andrew Moore for Noe and her husband, after six of Noe's children had died.

=== Reinvestigation and charges ===
Interest in the case was renewed after the publication of the 1997 book The Death of Innocents, about New York woman Waneta Hoyt, and an investigative article (Cradle to Grave by Stephen Fried) that appeared in the April 1998 issue of Philadelphia magazine.

Stephen Fried turned over his investigation results to the Philadelphia Police Department in March 1998. Upon questioning by police after receiving the material, Noe admitted to suffocating four of her children. She stated that she could not remember what happened to the other four children who died under similar circumstances. She was charged with first-degree murder in August 1998.

A plea agreement was reached in which Noe admitted to eight counts of second-degree murder and she was sentenced in June 1999 to 20 years of probation with the first five years under house arrest.

As a condition of her plea agreement, Noe agreed to psychiatric study in hopes of identifying what caused her to kill her children. In September 2001, a study was filed with the court which stated Noe had a mixed-personality disorder with avoidant, dependent, narcissistic, histrionic, borderline, paranoid and antisocial features.

== Books featuring Marie Noe ==
The book Cradle of Death by John Glatt is about Marie Noe and her children's murders. Many other books feature Marie Noe alongside other criminals, such as Engendered Death: Pennsylvania Women Who Kill by Joseph W. Laythe. The book The Life You Longed For: A Novel, by Maribeth Fischer, which is fictional, also mentions Noe's murders.

== See also ==
- List of serial killers in the United States
