= Sial, Kapurthala =

Sial
- Village
- Location in Punjab, India Sial (India)
- Coordinates: 31.272761°N 75.338303°E
- Country: India
- State: Punjab
- District: Kapurthala

Government
  - Type: Panchayati raj (India)
  - Body: Gram panchayat

Population (2011)
  - Total: 293
- Sex ratio 143/150♂/♀

Languages
  - Official: Punjabi
  - Other spoken: Hindi
- Time zone: UTC+5:30 (IST)
- PIN: 144620
- Telephone code: 01822
- ISO 3166 code: IN-PB
- Vehicle registration: PB-09
- Website: kapurthala.gov.in

Sial is a village in Kapurthala district of Punjab State, India. It is located 18 kilometres (11 mi) from Kapurthala, which is both district and sub-district headquarters of Sial. The village is administrated by a Sarpanch, who is an elected representative.

== Demography ==
According to the report published by Census India in 2011, Sial has 50 houses with the total population of 293 persons of which 143 are male and 150 females. Literacy rate of Sial is 76.61%, higher than the state average of 75.84%. The population of children in the age group 0–6 years is 45 which is 15.36% of the total population. Child sex ratio is approximately 1143, higher than the state average of 846.

== Population data ==
| Particulars | Total | Male | Female |
|---|---|---|---|
| Total No. of Houses | 50 | - | - |
| Population | 293 | 143 | 150 |
| Child (0-6) | 45 | 21 | 24 |
| Schedule Caste | 21 | 12 | 9 |
| Schedule Tribe | 0 | 0 | 0 |
| Literacy | 76.61 % | 79.51 % | 73.81 % |
| Total Workers | 114 | 83 | 31 |
| Main Worker | 98 | 0 | 0 |
| Marginal Worker | 16 | 3 | 13 |
