= Alfred Heer =

Swiss politician (1961–2025)

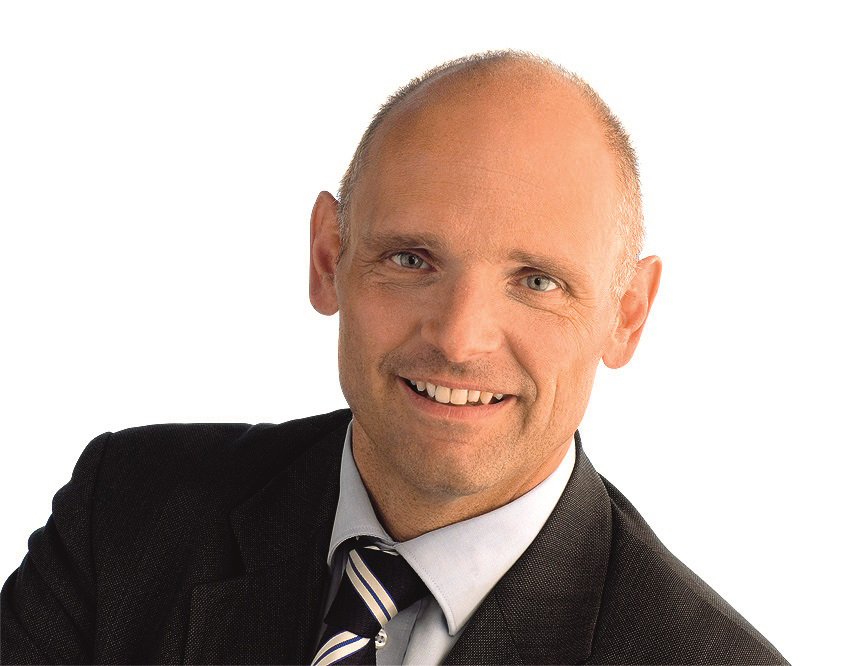
- Official portrait, 2019

Member of the National Council (Switzerland)
- In office 3 December 2007 – 19 September 2025
- Constituency: Canton of Zürich

Member of the Cantonal Council of Zürich
- In office 2 April 1995 – 7 July 2008

Personal details
- Born: Alfred Marius Heer; 12 October 1961 Zürich, Switzerland
- Died: 18 September 2025 (aged 63) Zürich, Switzerland
- Citizenship: Switzerland; Italy
- Party: Swiss People's Party
- Children: 1
- Occupation: Businessman; politician
- Website: Parliament website

Military service
- Allegiance: Switzerland
- Branch: Swiss Armed Forces
- Rank: Soldier

Alfred "Fredi" Marius Heer (German pronunciation: [ˈal.fʁeːt heːɐ̯]; 12 October 1961 – 19 September 2025) was a Swiss businessman and politician who served on the National Council (Switzerland) for the Swiss People's Party from 2007 to 2025 (his death). He concurrently served as member of the Parliamentary Assembly of the Council of Europe.

Heer previously served on the Cantonal Council of Zürich and on the City Council of Zurich. He was a well known right-wing politician with a focus on migration politics having also presided over the cantonal chapter of his political party between 2009 and 2016. He considered himself to be a Libertarian.

== Early life and education ==
Heer was born 12 October 1961 in Zurich, Switzerland, the youngest of three children, to Eduard Heer, a police officer, and Nelly Heer, a homemaker and later salesperson at Coop, into a Protestant family.

His upbringing was modest being initially raised in a two bedroom apartment in the Aussersihl, a predominantly working class neighborhood. Whilst his two older brothers went to college, Heer completed a commercial apprenticeship and later completed a federal certification.

== Career ==
In 2001, after holding a variety of positions, Heer became a partner in C and E GmbH, a small IT and software company headquartered in Zurich, which he co-founded with Mauro Tuena, who was a political party ally.

Heer also served as president of the Bund der Steuerzahler (Swiss Taxpayers Association) and on the board of trustees of the Audiatur-Stiftung (a nonprofit organization). He previously also served on the board of directors of Alex Weiss Immobilien und Finanz AG (a private real estate and investment firm).

He was a friend of Swiss-Albanian relations and was among the initiators of the Chamber of Commerce Switzerland-Kosova (between Switzerland and Kosovo) with the intentions to bring investors to the Balkans.

== Politics ==
Between 1994 and 1998, Heer served on the city council of Zürich. He was ultimately elected into Cantonal Council of Zürich where he served as a representative for the Swiss People's Party from 1995 to 2008. In the 2007 Swiss federal election he was elected into the National Council (Switzerland). From April 2009 to April 2016 Heer served as the president of the Swiss People's Party in the Canton of Zürich.

== Personal life ==
Heer was married to an Italian woman until 2003 and subsequently obtained Italian citizenship. The marriage produced one child. In the Swiss Armed Forces he held the rank of Soldier. He resided in Zürich until his death on 19 September 2025, at the age of 63.
