= Heer (surname) =

Heer is a surname. Notable people with the surname include:

- Alfred Heer (1961–2025), Swiss politician
- Ewald Heer (1930–2025), American aerospace engineer, author and academic
- Jeet Heer, Indo-Canadian author and journalist
- Jeffrey Heer (born 1979), American computer scientist and entrepreneur
- Kamal Heer (born 1973), Indian singer and musician of Punjabi music
- Oswald Heer (1809–1883), Swiss botanist and naturalist with the standard botanical author abbreviation Heer
- Manmohan Waris or Manmohan Heer (born 1967), Indian singer and musician of Punjabi music
- Sangtar or Sangtar Heer (born 1973), Indian composer and musician of Punjabi music
