= Angel Penna =

Angel Penna may refer to:

- Angel Penna, Sr. (1923–1992), Argentine-born U.S. Racing Hall of Fame thoroughbred trainer
- Angel Penna, Jr. (b. 1948), Argentine-born U.S. thoroughbred trainer; see Everglades Stakes
