= Hera, Iran =

Hera هرا
- Village
- Location within Iran
- Coordinates: 26°54′23″N 54°56′39″E
- Country: Iran
- Province: Hormozgan
- County: Bandar Lengeh
- Bakhsh: Central
- Rural District: Mehran

Population (2006)
  - Total: 290
- Time zone: UTC+3:30 (IRST)
  - Summer (DST): UTC+4:30 (IRDT)

Hera (Persian: هرا, also Romanized as Herā’ and Herā) is a village in Mehran Rural District, in the Central District of Bandar Lengeh County, Hormozgan Province, Iran. At the 2006 census, its population was 290, in 73 families.
