= Jacqueline de Heer =

Dutch softball player (born 1970)

Personal information
- Nationality: Dutch
- Born: 3 May 1970 (age 54); Rotterdam, Netherlands

Sport
- Sport: Softball

Jacqueline de Heer (born 3 May 1970) is a Dutch softball player. She competed in the women's tournament at the 1996 Summer Olympics.
