= Christina Sakala =

Zambian model

- Born: Christina Tintin Sakala; 28 January 1993 (age 33); Lusaka, Zambia
- Occupations: Model, actress
- Years active: 2014–present
- Modeling information
- Height: 1.76 m (5 ft 9 1/2 in)
- Agency: Isis models

Christina Sakala (born 28 January 1993) is a Zambian model. She represented Zambia at the 2015 Top Model of the World competition in Egypt at the age of 21.

She has worked with several Zambian models and designers, including Kapasa Musonda, Chiza Ngulube, Chisoma Lombe, Donalia Notando, Kabaso Nkandu, Cecilia Njovu, and Juliet Jacobs, Natasha Mapulanga, Kunda Kakoma, Tracy Kaoma, Joshua Nyirenda, and Cypatrick. She has also worked for brands, including the telecommunications company Airtel.

== Biography ==
=== Early life and education ===
Christina Sakala was born on January 28, 1993 in Lusaka, the capital of Zambia where she grew up in a family with 7 siblings. Her parents separated when she was young. She attended the Roma Girls secondary school and continued her studies at the University of Lusaka and Cavendish University where she studied for a law degree.

=== Career ===
Sakala first started modeling at the age of 21 when she participated in an SBM fashion show. She became a household name after participating in an audition organized by Pink Diamond International Model Academy and Mumba Children Project, where she was selected to represent Zambia at the Top Model of the World pageant.

In 2017, she represented Zambia at the Miss Globe 2017 pageant but did not compete. Later that year she walked the runway at the Shanghai Black Fashion Week, showcasing designs by Zambian designers Chishimba Katongo and Karen Shula.
