= Hera (barquentine) =

The Hera was a 4 mast 280 ft long steel barque, that foundered in rough weather on 30 January 1914.

The wreck is now a popular site with scuba divers, at a maximum depth of around 18m it is suitable for levels from open water and up. It was launched in 1886 in Geestemünde.
