= Sialkot, Mansehra =

Pakistani village

Sialkot سیالکوٹ
- Village
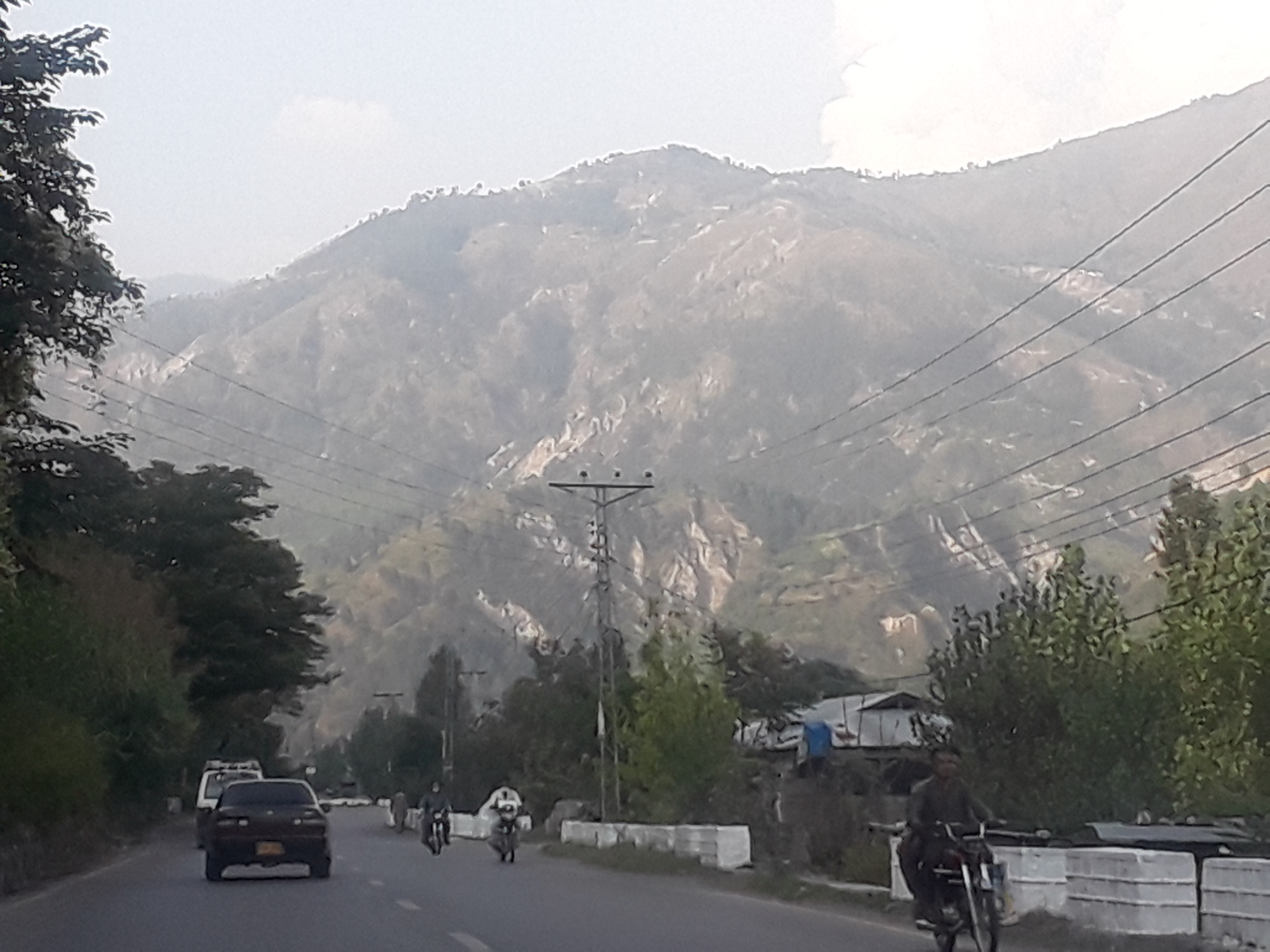
- Sialkot

- Location within Khyber Pakhtunkhwa
- Coordinates: 34.82734°N 71.97222°E
- Country: Pakistan
- Province: Khyber Pakhtunkhwa
- District: Mansehra
- Time zone: UTC+05:00 (PKT)

Sialkot (Northern Hindko: سیال کوٹ, Urdu: سیالکوٹ) is a village in Mansehra District, Khyber Pakhtunkhwa, in Pakistan. It is a tourist destination and close to Abbottabad. Sialkot was previously destroyed in an earthquake. Between 1970 and March 2025, Sialkot has had 671 quakes of magnitude up to 6.2 within 100 km (63 mi) distance.
