= Sagala language =

Sagala language may be:

- Saghala language (Northern Sagala, Kenya)
- Sagara language (Southern Sagala, Tanzania)
