= Achille Vander Heeren =

Belgian Catholic biblical scholar

Achille Vander Heeren (1880-1956) was a Belgian Catholic biblical scholar. He was Professor of Moral Theology and Librarian at the Great Seminary, Bruges. He wrote several articles for the Catholic Encyclopedia, including those on Scandal (theology), and Suicide.

He also wrote a series of pamphlets circulated among Dutch-speaking Catholics in the 1930s: De Joden: hun bekering (1935), Gelooven (1936), Sint Jans Evangelie (1937).
