= Murder of Dolores Della Penna =

Murdered American child

Dolores Della Penna
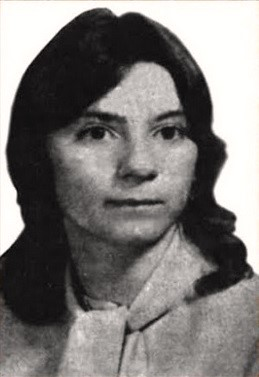
- Della Penna, c. 1972
- Born: December 13, 1954; Philadelphia, Pennsylvania, U.S.
- Died: July 12, 1972 (aged 17); Kensington, Pennsylvania, U.S.
- Cause of death: Undetermined. Possible stabbing and/or decapitation
- Body discovered: July 22, 1972; Toms River, New Jersey 39.994264°N 74.166154°W (approximate); July 29, 1972; Cedar Glen West, New Jersey 40.03820°N 74.30054°W (approximate)
- Resting place: Resurrection Cemetery, Bensalem, Pennsylvania; 40.12170°N 74.92330°W (approximate)
- Occupation: Student
- Known for: Victim of unsolved murder
- Height: 5 ft 3 in (1.60 m)

The murder of Dolores Della Penna is an unsolved murder case dating from July 1972 in which a 17-year-old high school graduate was abducted, tortured, murdered and dismembered by an unknown number of individuals in Kensington, Philadelphia. Her dismembered torso, arms and legs were later discovered in New Jersey, although her head has never been found.

Although the motive for Della Penna's abduction and murder remains unclear, investigators believe she may have been targeted by drug dealers either due to her being falsely blamed by former roommates for the theft of drugs or in an act of revenge against her boyfriend relating to an unsettled drug debt. The case itself has been described as one of Philadelphia's most gruesome and enduring unsolved murders.

== Early life ==
Dolores Marie Della Penna was born in Tacony, Philadelphia on December 13, 1954, the second of two children born to Ralph and Helen (née DiMichele) Della Penna. Her father was a chemist, and her mother a homemaker. The family resided in a semi-detached house in a blue-collar section of Tacony composed predominantly of families of Polish or Italian ancestry. By 1971, Della Penna's older brother, Ralph Jr., had married and moved into his own house.

An honors graduate of St. Hubert Catholic High School for Girls, Della Penna was described by her parents as a "kind, obedient and family-oriented" girl who was markedly studious and refrained from conflicts. She held aspirations to attend college in September 1972, with aspirations to ultimately become a radiographer. Della Penna did not own a car, although unbeknownst to her, her parents had plans to purchase a car for her eighteenth birthday.

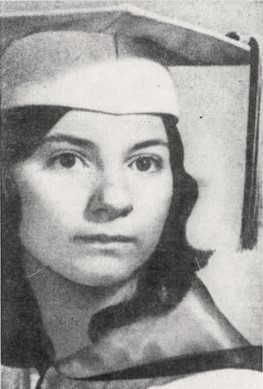
Della Penna, pictured at her high school graduation ceremony, June 1972.

=== Graduation ===
Della Penna did not attend her high school prom following her June 1972 graduation, and according to her sister-in-law, Della Penna viewed the summer following her graduation as one which she intended to take full advantage of as it would be "the last summer she could enjoy before she had to work for the rest of her life". Her sister-in-law would also state that by approximately January 1972, Della Penna had become somewhat acquainted with several Kensington teenagers whom she knew to occasionally experiment with drugs, and that by the spring of 1972 Della Penna would travel to socialize with these individuals approximately four times per week.

Shortly after her graduation, Della Penna and three female friends with whom she had recently become acquainted opted to rent a bungalow upon Forget-Me-Not Road in Wildwood Crest, New Jersey, with view to renting the property solely for the summer of 1972. The property was located approximately 95 miles (153 km) from her parents' home, and the money necessary to rent the property was provided by Della Penna's parents as a gift for her having graduated with honors from high school.

In late-June, Della Penna learned her parents, older brother and other family members planned to visit Walt Disney World. According to her mother, upon hearing this, Della Penna informed her, "You're not going without me." The entire family commenced their 10-day vacation on July 1, returning home on July 10.

=== July 11, 1972 ===
On the morning of July 11, 1972 Della Penna assisted her mother with several household chores; that afternoon, she composed several songs upon the family organ before visiting a local store to purchase cigarettes. Shortly after returning home, she spoke with several friends on the telephone before making plans to meet two friends named Carol Nichols and Betty Nicastro that evening.

== Abduction ==
At approximately 8 p.m. on July 11, Della Penna, Nichols and Nicastro hitchhiked from Tacony to Kensington to visit Nichols's fiance. Shortly after 11 p.m., Della Penna and Nichols left her fiance's home, with both girls intending to take separate trolleybuses to their homes. According to Nichols, her friend exited the Route 5 trolleybus upon which both had been traveling at the corner of Frankford and Torresdale Avenues, where Della Penna expressed mild dismay at having just missed her intended connecting Route 56 trolleybus home and remarking to Nichols she would "have a twenty minute wait" for the next bus. Nichols remained aboard the Route 5 trolleybus.

Della Penna is known to have boarded the next Route 56 trolleybus to arrive at this bus stop at approximately 11:39 p.m. The driver of this trolleybus, Joseph Kilcoyne, would later inform investigators the girl alighted his trolleybus at the corner of Knorr Street—three blocks and approximately one mile from her home—sometime between 11:50 and 11:55 p.m.

According to an eyewitness to her abduction, Della Penna was attacked by a slender, brown-haired white male aged between twenty and twenty-five after she had walked approximately one block from the trolleybus stop. This witness observed Della Penna being beaten, then swiftly dragged "kicking and screaming" into a maroon 1965 or 1969 model Chevrolet parked close to her own home and hastily driven from the scene. The sole evidence recovered at the site of Della Penna's abduction was her maroon jacket, door key, a small cross and a crucifix which had been gifts given to her by friends at her high school graduation.

=== Initial investigation ===
The circumstances regarding Della Penna's disappearance led police to rapidly determine she had been abducted, and numerous investigators were assigned to the investigation into her abduction. In addition to the eyewitness testimony pertaining to her being beaten and hastily forced into a Chevrolet containing more than one individual, (Note: Via eyewitness descriptions, investigators would determine the driver of the Chevrolet had been a white male aged between 20 and 25, weighing approximately 160 pounds with chin length brown hair and a slender build. This individual had been approximately 5 ft 9 in (1.75 m) in height.) several local residents also informed investigators they had heard a young woman's high-pitched screams emanating from the vicinity of Tulip and Rawle Street—corroborating the actual eyewitness's account of her actual abduction. More than 20,000 circulars describing the abduction vehicle were distributed across Philadelphia in efforts to trace the vehicle and identify Della Penna's abductors in the weeks following her abduction, although this initiative failed to bear fruit.

Subsequent leads garnered would extend inquiries as far afield as New York, although all leads of inquiry ultimately proved fruitless. A substantial reward for her safe return was also offered, to no avail.

Within the first week of investigative inquiries, over 150 individuals within both Philadelphia and New Jersey—in particular within and around the Jersey Shore district—were questioned with regards to Della Penna's disappearance. Several are known to have failed polygraph tests, and these individuals were typically involved in the usage or trafficking of narcotics, leading detectives to suspect a conspiracy of silence; however, investigators found no evidence Della Penna had herself used or sold drugs.

== Discovery ==
Della Penna's mutilated torso and severed arms were discovered by a man walking his dog through a wooded area close to Oakwood Avenue in Jackson Township, New Jersey on July 22, 1972; (Note: A forensic pathologist would determine Della Penna's arms and torso had lain at this location for a minimum of eight days prior to discovery.) her legs were found beside a dirt road in adjacent Manchester Township, New Jersey seven days later. Both body recovery locations were close to Route 571 and were separated by a distance of approximately 19 miles (31 km). Her body was formally identified on July 24 via X-ray records of her spinal column taken while a patient within Nazareth Hospital in 1970.

An autopsy was unable to determine the cause of death nor whether Della Penna had been sexually assaulted, although the coroner did note that she had been extensively beaten prior to her death and that the dismemberment of her body had been conducted in a methodical manner with a sharp instrument, as opposed to in a hacking manner, indicating that the dismemberment had occurred after death. The degree of precision with which the mutilation and disembowelment had been inflicted indicated that the individual responsible likely possessed an advanced degree of anatomical knowledge. Furthermore, her fingertips had also been severed from her hands after death in an evident effort to prevent identification. Despite numerous searches of locations such as lakes, woodland, and the Toms River, Della Penna's head has never been recovered.

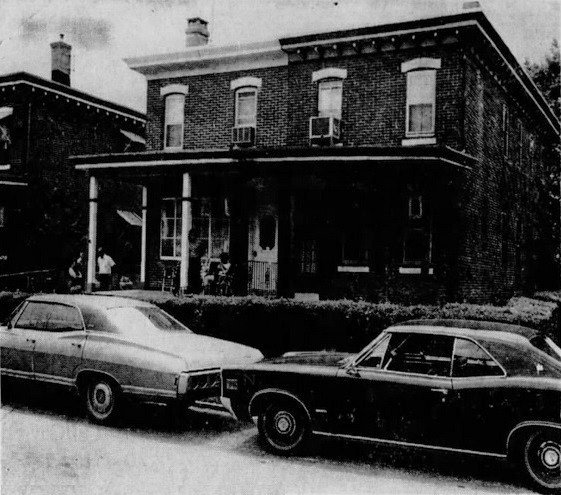
Family and friends of Delores Della Penna, pictured outside her home in Tacony four days after the discovery of her body.

=== Funeral ===
Dolores Della Penna was laid to rest on the morning of August 4, 1972. Her interment followed a 9:30 a.m. concelebrated Mass held at the Galzerano Funeral Home and Our Lady of Consolation Church in accordance with her Roman Catholic faith. She was laid to rest within Resurrection Cemetery in Bucks County, Pennsylvania.

== Further investigations ==
The disappearance of Della Penna and the subsequent discovery of her dismembered body generated intense press and public interest. Following the discovery of her remains, the Philadelphia Police Department, the New Jersey State Police and the FBI launched an intense, coordinated manhunt to apprehend the individual or individuals responsible. (Note: Due to the fact Della Penna had evidently initially been kidnapped, following the discovery and identification of her torso, Philadelphia investigators had formally requested assistance into her abduction and murder from the FBI.) Over 1,500 individuals would be questioned in the two months following the discovery of her body alone, with inquiries ultimately expanding nationwide and as far afield as Scotland. Investigators would gradually accrue over sixteen separate boxes of documentation pertaining to the investigation; however, all lines of inquiry failed to yield results.

On what would have been Della Penna's eighteenth birthday, the Philadelphia Daily News increased a previously offered reward of $4,000 to $10,000 for any information leading to the arrest and conviction of her murderer or murderers, with the periodical assuring the public they could remain anonymous in submitting any information should they wish. (Note: To assure the public they could anonymously claim the reward for any tip submitted and leading to the arrest and conviction of Della Penna's murderer(s), the public were urged to write their own six-digit sequence of numbers on both bottom corners of the final page of the anonymous tip, then to tear off and retain the lower right corner containing one entry of the personal code which, following the conviction of the perpetrator(s), they were to recite to authenticate their claim for the reward.) This appeal and reward offer generated several public tips, although none resulted in the apprehension of her murderers.

Despite intense investigative efforts, Della Penna's murder gradually became a cold case, although the case remained open—receiving periodic reviews in the following decades. (Note: Several of the investigators assigned to the case would later admit to becoming personally affected by the brutality of Della Penna's murder, the fact she had not been involved in the usage or selling of narcotics, and the fact her murder remained unsolved.)

== Later developments ==
In June 1990, a 34-year-old prison inmate testified before a grand jury convened to rule upon testimony pertaining to several known local drug dealers' potential involvement in Della Penna's abduction and murder that he had actually witnessed the events following her abduction and preceding her actual murder. The inmate himself had been 16 years old and a minor participant in logistical street-level operations relating to drug dealing within Philadelphia at the time he claimed to have delivered a package of drugs to a Kensington garage where he testified to having witnessed Della Penna—with both "tears and blood" streaming down her face—tied to an old car seat with her hands bound behind her back.

According to the inmate's testimony, Della Penna had been falsely accused by two of her three Wildwood Crest roommates of stealing a caché of drugs worth $200 (the equivalent of about $1,550 as of 2026) and that the motive for her murder had been revenge. He had briefly witnessed four assailants surrounding her after she had received an evident beating, with one of the assailants also yelling "Bitch! You're going to pay!" before striking her upper arm with a machete before the witness himself left the scene. Furthermore, this individual emphasized the participants in the murder later learned Della Penna had not actually stolen the drugs. He further testified he had never informed police of his knowledge of Della Penna's torture and murder due to fears for his own safety but that as he was now an inmate at Graterford Prison, he no longer feared potential repercussions from the perpetrators.

Investigators would vigorously scrutinize this inmate's claims over the course of two years before accepting his account as truth; they would later interview other individuals who would also confess to having either witnessed Della Penna's murder or later conversed with individuals who had confessed their participation. One of these individuals was a former national officer of the Pagan's Motorcycle Club, who confessed to having loaned the vehicle used in Della Penna's abduction to a fellow motorcycle gang member prior to the event, only to learn the actual purpose for the vehicle's loan after her death. This individual also emphasized that Della Penna had been innocent of any drugs theft.

Several of these later accounts reconciled and corroborated with the original inmate's confession to authorities.

=== Suspects' identification ===
By 1994, investigators had amassed sufficient information to determine both the identities of her murderers and the precise events to occur prior to, during, and after Della Penna's abduction and murder; however, although they had amassed ample circumstantial evidence and corroborating testimony, they lacked sufficient real evidence to charge the five known suspects who were still alive. Although investigators formally requested District Attorney Lynne Abraham approve arrest warrants for these five individuals on July 10, 1996, their request was denied, with Abraham stating her belief that securing a successful prosecution largely based upon inmates' testimony was unlikely. This information was confirmed by Homicide Inspector Jerrold Kane in a press statement held on July 11, 1996.

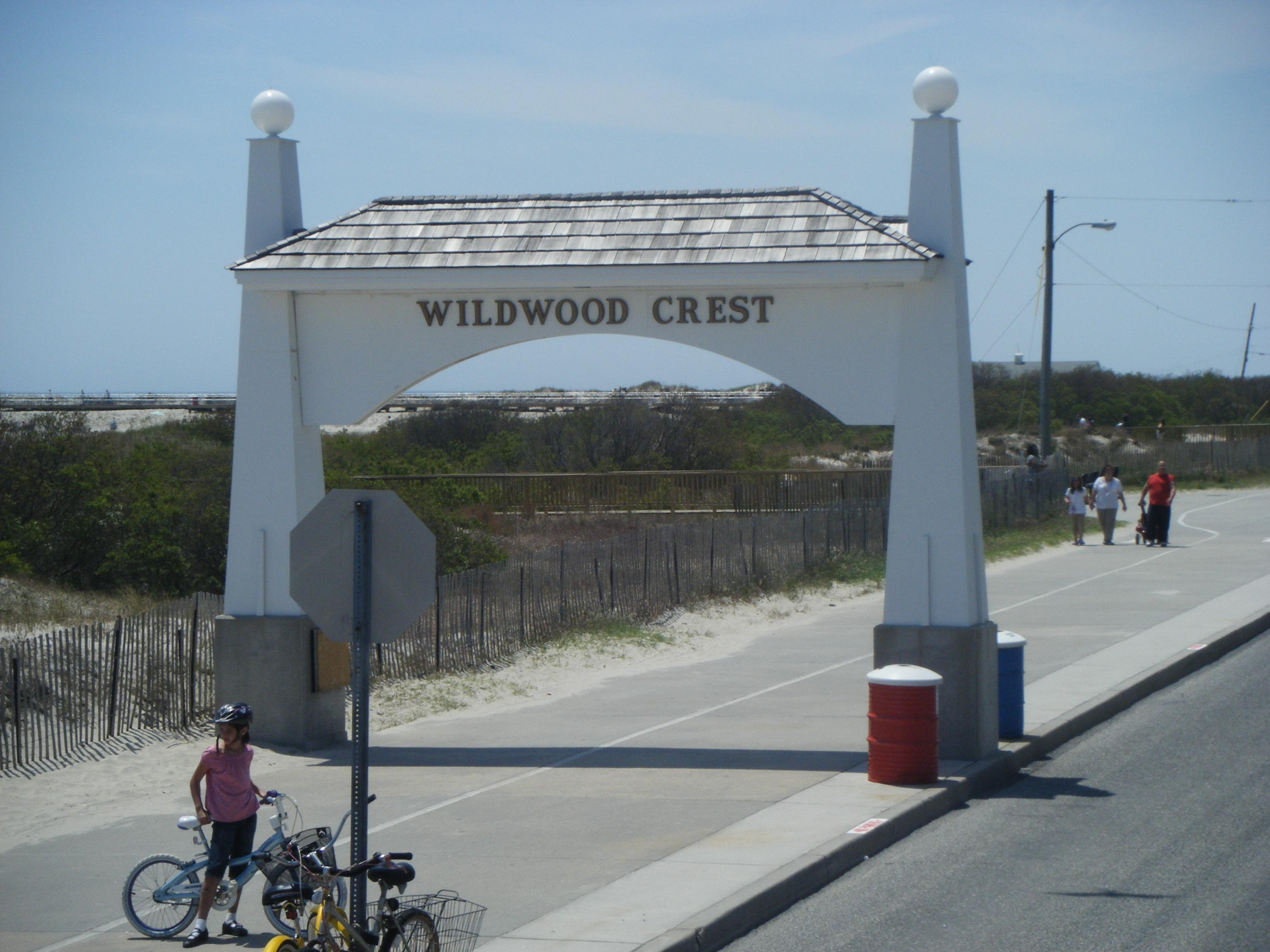
Wildwood Crest, New Jersey. Della Penna was falsely accused of the theft of drugs by her roommates shortly after the four girls moved into a bungalow within this borough in June 1972.

== Alleged events and circumstances ==
Three months prior to Kane's July 1996 announcement, at the insistence of Della Penna's parents, two homicide detectives visited their household to relay what they believed to be the full information pertaining to their daughter's abduction and murder to them without omitting any details:

=== Roommates' drug theft and scapegoating ===
With possible assistance by their boyfriends and/or other acquaintances, at least two of Della Penna's three Wildwood Crest roommates had indeed stolen a caché of drugs from a local drug dealer sometime in early- or mid-June 1972. Shortly thereafter, the dealer and acquaintances had confronted the girls and their boyfriends about the theft, demanding payment and threatening violence. All had denied any involvement and attempted to appease the dealers with promises of locating the missing drugs or paying the outstanding debt. Della Penna was not present either at the time of the theft or initial confrontations, although she would have been aware of rising tensions within the bungalow and the reasons why.

Upon learning of her family's plans to visit Walt Disney World in Florida a week or so later, Della Penna had opted to join her family for the vacation, although by the time of her return on July 10, her roommates and their boyfriends had falsely diverted blame for the theft onto her. The drug dealers had believed the roommates' claim and decided to exact revenge, initially intending to kidnap Della Penna for ransom to repay the debt resulting from the theft, with apparent initial view to releasing her once the ransom had been paid.

=== Misdirected retribution ===
At least nine individuals were involved in the commission of the abduction and murder. (Note: Three of these individuals had died by September 1994. A fourth had died by the time of Jerrold Kane's July 1996 press conference.) The actual abduction had occurred close to the Della Penna household just before midnight, with two of the perpetrators standing outside the kidnap vehicle with the vehicle's hood raised in order to deceive Della Penna into believing they were fixing their vehicle as she approached. She was then grabbed and beaten before she was rapidly bundled into the car, where she was gagged, further beaten and threatened. She was then driven to a pre-selected garage on Jasper Street, Kensington, "to teach her a lesson". Della Penna was bound to an old car seat and informed of the reason for her kidnap, with her abductors also threatening to kill her if she did not agree to engage in sex with them.

Della Penna's ordeal lasted for numerous hours, with the beatings and other forms of abuse rendering her unconscious on at least one occasion. Despite the prolonged mental and physical torture she endured, Della Penna had repeatedly protested her innocence in relation to the theft of the drugs while continuously weeping and pleading for her life. She was murdered sometime on July 12, with her body beheaded within the garage by one of her stupefied assailants.

=== Body disposal ===
After her death, Della Penna's murderers drove her decapitated body from the garage to a location beneath the Tacony–Palmyra Bridge where her torso was further mutilated and her arms and legs severed before the perpetrators discarded the body parts in Jackson and Manchester Township. Her head had later been wrapped in a plastic car seat cover, bound with ignition wire and thrown into a lake close to Franklin Mills Mall. (Note: Contemporary investigative records indicate this lake had been dredged shortly after Della Penna's murder.)

The brutality of [her murder] ... that will never leave me. What a terrible way for such a young girl to die.

— Jackson Township Public Safety Director and former patrolman William G. Mulligan, reflecting on the ferocity of Della Penna's murder and the resulting impact upon law enforcement personnel. March 23, 1992.

Della Penna's murderers would later learn she had actually been innocent of the drugs theft.

== Aftermath ==
In 1973, the Eugene Alessandroni lodge of the Order Sons of Italy in America established an annual scholarship fee of $500 in memory of Dolores Della Penna. This award is presented to an outstanding student at St. Hubert Catholic High School for Girls, where Della Penna had graduated with honors one month prior to her murder. Della Penna's parents were present at the first awards presentation ceremony.

Della Penna's parents relocated from Tacony to Holmesburg, Philadelphia, in 1976. Within their new home, they recreated their daughter's bedroom to appear almost precisely as it had been on the date of her abduction and murder. They also established a lifelong ritual of observing Mass on each anniversary of their daughter's murder and upon her birthday before visiting her grave, and maintained this solemn practice until their respective deaths in 2004 and 2015.

No individual was ever charged with the murder of Dolores Della Penna. By the twenty-fifth anniversary of her death, several of the prime suspects had themselves died.

== See also ==
- Crime in Philadelphia
- List of murdered American children
- List of solved missing person cases: 1950–1999
- List of unsolved murders (1900–1979)
- Scapegoating

== Cited works and further reading ==
- Douglas, John; Olshaker, Mark (2012). The Cases That Haunt Us. New York: Scribner. ISBN 978-0-743-21239-7.
- Halber, Deborah (2014). The Skeleton Crew: How Amateur Sleuths Are Solving America's Cold Cases. Cambridge: Cambridge University Press. ISBN 978-1-107-04145-5.
- Innes, Brian (2000). Bodies of Evidence. London: Amber Books Ltd. ISBN 978-1-856-05623-6.
- Katz, Hélèna (2010). Cold Cases: Famous Unsolved Mysteries, Crimes, and Disappearances in America. Santa Barbara: Greenwood Publishing Group. ISBN 978-0-313-37692-4.
- Newton, Michael (2004). The Encyclopedia of Unsolved Crimes. New York City: Checkmark Books. ISBN 0-816-04980-7.
- Thompson, Emily G. (2018). Unsolved Child Murders: Eighteen American Cases, 1956–1998. North Carolina: McFarland & Company Inc. ISBN 978-1-476-67000-3.
- Viola, Michael (2013). Time's-a-Marchin': Life Through the Lens of a News Photographer. Bloomington, Indiana: Xlibris US. ISBN 978-1-479-75251-5.
