= Hiralal =

Hiralal is a given name. Notable people with the name include:

- Hiralal (actor), Indian film actor
- Shirish Hiralal Chaudhari, member of the 13th Maharashtra Legislative Assembly
- Hiralal Datta (born 1959), Indian cricketer
- Hiralal Gaekwad (1923–2003), Indian cricketer
- Bahwandi Hiralal (born 1951), former Malaysian football player
- Hiralal J Kania or H. J. Kania (1890–1951), the first Chief Justice of India
- Madhukar Hiralal Kania (born 1927), the 23rd Chief Justice of India
- Hiralal Macchi, Indian cricketer
- Hiralal Mukherjee (1886–1962), Indian professional footballer
- Hiralal Pippal, Indian politician from the state of the Madhya Pradesh
- Hiralal Sen (1866–1917), Indian photographer, one of India's first filmmakers
- Hiralal Shastri (1899–1974), Indian politician, first chief minister of Rajasthan state
- Dhirendra Hiralal Waghela (born 1954), the Chief Justice of the Bombay High Court

== See also ==
- Hiralal Bhakat College, established in 1986 in Nalhati, India
- Nabagram Hiralal Paul College, also known as Konnagar College, established in 1957 in Konnagar, West Bengal, India
- Hero Hiralal, 1988 film directed by Ketan Mehta, starring Naseeruddin Shah and Sanjana Kapoor
- Hiralal Majumdar Memorial College for Women, established in 1959, in Dakshineswar, Kolkata
