= George S. Graham =

American politician

George Graham
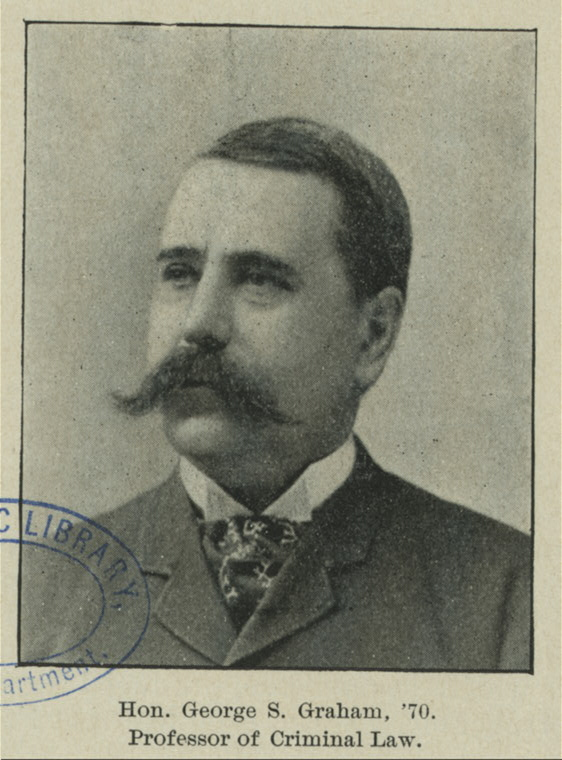

Member of the U.S. House of Representatives from Pennsylvania's 2nd district
- In office March 4, 1913 – July 4, 1931
- Preceded by: William Reyburn
- Succeeded by: Edward Stokes

7th District Attorney of Philadelphia, Pennsylvania
- In office January 5, 1880 – January 2, 1899
- Preceded by: Henry Hagert
- Succeeded by: Frederick Rothermel

Personal details
- Born: September 13, 1850 Philadelphia, Pennsylvania, U.S.
- Died: July 4, 1931 (aged 80) Islip, New York, U.S.
- Party: Republican
- Education: University of Pennsylvania
- Profession: Attorney, Politician

George Scott Graham (September 13, 1850 – July 4, 1931) was a Republican member of the U.S. House of Representatives from Pennsylvania.

Graham was born in Philadelphia, Pennsylvania. He graduated from the law department of the University of Pennsylvania at Philadelphia in 1870, and practiced law in Philadelphia. He was member of the select council of Philadelphia from 1877 to 1880, and an unsuccessful candidate for District Attorney of Philadelphia in 1877. He was elected district attorney of Philadelphia in 1880 and served until 1899. He later resumed the practice of law in Philadelphia and New York City. He was a professor of criminal law and procedure in the University of Pennsylvania from 1887 to 1898. He was a delegate to the Republican National Conventions in 1892 and 1924.

He was elected to Congress as a Republican in 1912, and served until his death at his summer home in Islip, New York.

== Notable Criminals Brought to Trial ==
While serving as Philadelphia District Attorney, Graham tried several notable cases. In 1887, Graham prosecuted Hannah Mary Tabbs and George H. Wilson for the murder and dismemberment of Wakefield Gains. In his opening statement, he declared, "We will show by scientific testimony that Wakefield Gains was dismembered while there was yet life in the body." Wilson was convicted of first degree murder, but was granted a new trial. Judge Hare accepted a plea of second degree murder and sentenced Wilson to twelve years in Eastern Penitentiary. For Hannah Mary Tabbs part in the murder, the judge sentenced her to two years in prison.

In 1895, District Attorney Graham prosecuted notorious criminal Jimmy Logue's stepson, Alphonso Cutaiar, for the murder of Logue's wife, Johanna, whose body was found in their old home underneath the kitchen floor. Philadelphia Police Detective Frank Geyer originally thought Jimmy committed the murder but after Jimmy's story checked out and all evidence pointed to his stepson, who eventually confessed to her murder, Cutaiar was arrested and convicted of first degree murder.

By far the most famous case he prosecuted as district attorney was H. H. Holmes, one of America's first serial killers. Although Holmes confessed to killing twenty-seven men, women, and children, he was only tried for killing his business partner, Benjamin Pitezel. Graham worked closely with Detective Frank Geyer and requested he search for Pitezel's missing three children, whom Holmes took temporary custody of after Benjamin's death. Geyer went on a cross-country, international search for the children, which led him to discover their remains in two locations, Irvington and Canada. However, Graham made it clear, Holmes was to be tried only for Benjamin Pitezel and if found not guilty, he would consider extraditing Holmes to Indianapolis or Toronto, Canada for the murders of the children. Holmes was found guilty and was hung May 7, 1896.

== See also ==
- List of members of the United States Congress who died in office (1900–1949)

== Sources ==
- United States Congress. "George S. Graham (id: G000354)". Biographical Directory of the United States Congress.

U.S. House of Representatives
Preceded by William Reyburn	Member of the U.S. House of Representatives from Pennsylvania's 2nd congressional district 1913–1931	Succeeded by Edward Stokes
Legal offices
Preceded by Henry Hagert	District Attorney of Philadelphia, Pennsylvania; 1880–1899	Succeeded by Frederick Rothermel
