= Jimmy Logue =

American burglar

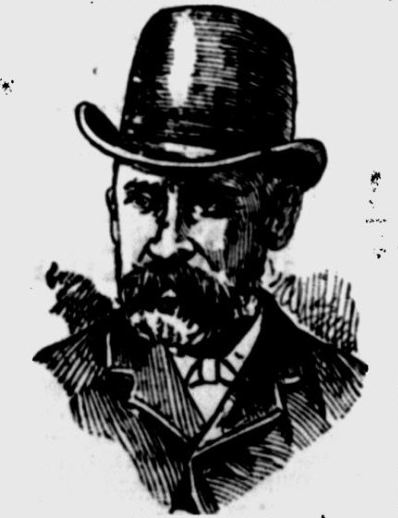
Illustration of Jimmy Logue from 1895 newspaper The Daily Star

James E. Logue (c. 1837 – October 4, 1899) was a Philadelphia based burglar who is thought to have stolen more than $300,000 over the course of his criminal career. He mostly targeted homes and shops but also occasionally banks and spent time in and out of jail. In brief announcements of his death in 1899, he was referred to as "the notorious bank robber". He is perhaps better known for the disappearance of his third wife, Joanna, who was later discovered to have been murdered by her nephew, Alphonso Cutaiar.

== Early life ==
Logue was born in Philadelphia around 1837 to an Episcopal family and began stealing when he was a teenager. According to him, it came naturally to him and he told his physician on his death bed that "It was born in me. I couldn't help it." Logue was first sent to the House of Refuge when he was 10 years old in 1847 for larceny, and again in 1852.

His real name was alternately claimed to be William Casey, and Henry Greyson, the latter of which he can be found recorded as on the 1880 census in the Eastern State Penitentiary, however, these are believed to be aliases.

Logue's father, Charles Logue, was a tavern keeper. It was said that Logue's mother, Mary Logue, owned a large piece of property later in life but she claimed that while pregnant with Logue, his father was spending all their money on alcohol and not providing for their family and so she had to steal money from his pocket while he slept. She believed this was the reason thievery seemed inherent in Logue. Logue later attempted to use this as a defense in court.

== Criminal life ==
Logue was arrested and convicted several times throughout his life. As an adult, his first conviction was in 1855, followed swiftly in 1857, both for larceny. Although he was arrested several times in between 1862 and 1871, mostly for larceny, sometimes assault, he was often never charged, or his case never went to trial, and he was released. He evaded capture many times because he was allegedly in league with certain detectives, though the man who claimed this to be true, Detective Taggerty, died in an insane asylum.

Not until May 1871 was he finally convicted again, and sentenced to 7 years in Eastern State Penitentiary for larceny, burglary, conspiracy to commit a felony, and robbery. While serving his time, his friends petitioned for his pardon, which of course failed. Logue was not released until 1877. During his arrest, the police attempted to have his photograph taken for the Rogues Gallery but Logue refused and made it so difficult for them that they eventually gave up. When asked why they didn't force Logue to sit still by holding him by the ears, an officer responded, "It's as much as a man's life is worth to meddle with Logue. He may be out in a month, and I didn't want a bullet in my back."

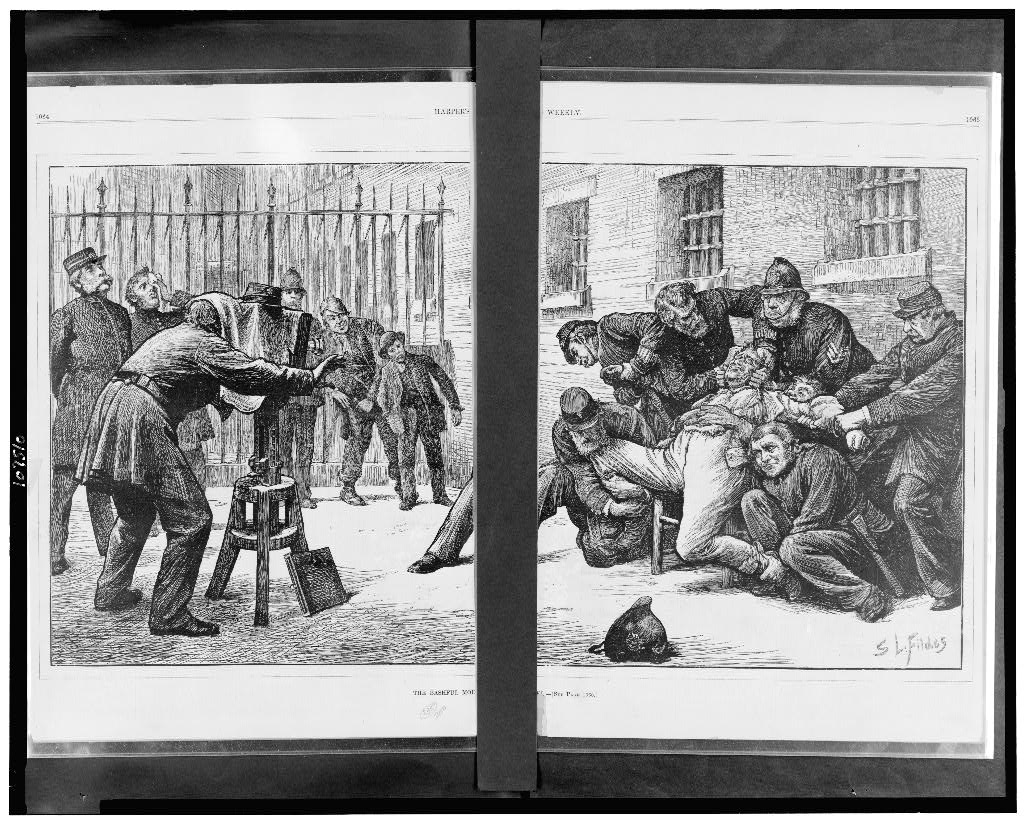
Much like how Logue's photograph was probably taken, a scene in Newgate Prison, London, where a prisoner, being held down by police, is compelled to sit for his photograph, to be placed in the "Rogue's Gallery".

After his release in 1877, Logue quickly resumed his criminal career, partaking in several high-profile thefts, but he wasn't convicted again until 1879 for a burglary of a safe in a "segar" (cigar) store. It was believed that Logue was also responsible for a number of other robberies which had taken place recently in Philadelphia, including that of a pawn shop two weeks prior. During the bail hearing, Logue was named as Henry Greyson, it being believed that Jimmy Logue was an alias. His bail was set at $3,000. At the same hearing, an attempt was made by unknown persons to free Logue from the court house but their effort was thwarted by an officer. On November 10, Logue was sentenced to 3 years and 9 months after pleading guilty.

Prior to his recapture in November, Logue had committed a robbery in February in Boston, during the time his third wife disappeared. He was also involved in the Dexter Bank robbery in Maine during February 1878 and was connected to robberies of the Corn Exchange National Bank, the Norristown Bank, the Catholic Beneficial Savings fund in which $3,000 was stolen, and of many other crimes New York and Massachusetts, in addition to Pennsylvania. He was also thought to have been involved in the attempted robbery of the United States sub-treasury in Philadelphia.

In 1883, Logue was again captured during a robbery of a jewelry store of 3rd and Arch streets in Philadelphia in which $1,500 worth of jewelry was stolen. Several accomplices were apprehended as well. The group were later released due to lack of evidence against them, however, Logue was convicted later that year for a robbery in Reading, PA and served three years in Berks County.

In 1886, Logue was once again arrested, this time for the robbery a grocery store on N. 13th St. and bail was set at $2,000. After a long struggle, Logue was subdued enough to finally have his photograph taken for the Rogues Gallery, though his features were distorted presumably by motion blur. He served another six years in the Penitentiary.

Not long out of jail, Logue was arrested again in 1892 when he was charged with the burglary of several residences and held in bail for $1,000. After being acquitted of at least one of the crimes he was charged with, he was sentenced to only ten months in Moyamensing Prison.

In 1896, Logue was accused of assault and battery by his daughter-in-law Matilda Logue. Though acquitted, the judge warned him to stay away from Matilda and Logue agreed by saying, "A burnt child never plays with the fire."

It was believed that at some point before he was 40 years old, Logue had spent some time in the West where he racked up a sizable sum and invested it in a relative.

== Marriages ==
On January 20, 1861, Logue married Mary Jane Andrews and lived with her for two years before they separated but never officially divorced. In an act of bigamy, he then married again, to another Mary (whose maiden name was Gahan). Mary had an illegitimate son named Alphonso Cutaiar Jr., who eventually became a barber. Logue set his stepson up with a barber shop and used it as a cover for his own source of criminal income.

On February 15, 1870, Logue's second wife Mary died. Just before the start of one of his trials in 1871, Logue married to Mary's sister, Joanna, before being sentenced to seven years in prison. He was released early 1877, at which point he bought a house at 1250 North 11th Street in Philadelphia where his wife and stepson Alphonso resided with him.

An article from 1881 claimed that Logue had children who were cared for by a lawyer while Logue was in jail for three years from 1879 cigar shop burglary. One of these children was a son named Percy.

== Disappearance and Discovery of Third Wife ==
In February 1879, Logue traveled to Boston to complete a job with fellow thief George Mason but when he returned to his home in Philadelphia, he found Joanna was gone. Cutaiar claimed that Joanna had declared she was leaving permanently and then rushed to the railroad station before he could escort her there. Jimmy searched across the country for her but eventually gave up and left their home in the hands of Cutaiar, who later sold it.

Fourteen years after Joanna's disappearance, the owners of 1250 North 11th Street were having the floorboards fixed when a skeleton was discovered beneath them. Personal artifacts, including an inscribed ring, found with the skeleton confirmed it to be Joanna's. Though Logue was initially suspected, proof that he had been in Boston during the time of Joanna's disappearance exonerated him. When faced with the knowledge that he was the only other person with access to the house during the time of her disappearance, Cutaiar confessed. He tried to claim her death was an accident and his improper disposal of her body done out of fear but the court did not believe him, mostly due to Joanna's missing jewelry and bonds, which Cutaiar stole.

Cutaiar was initially sentenced to death but it was later commuted and served his time in the Eastern State Penitentiary. In 1904, a pardon was attempted but a judge denied it, saying that Cutaiar was lucky to not receive the death penalty. On September 23, 1912, Governor John K. Tener granted Cutaiar a pardon after District Attorney George S. Graham, who prosecuted Cutaiar, wrote the pardons board a letter in his favor. It read in part, "When reviewing all the facts and evidence in the case it was impossible for me to exclude the thought that I had not proved first degree murder beyond a doubt." A 1920 United States Census showed Cutaiar living with his family and two boarders in Philadelphia's thirty-forth ward. His occupation was listed as sexton for a local church.

== Death ==
Jimmy died penniless of oedema of the lungs on October 4, 1899 in the Philadelphia County almshouse, and was buried in the cemetery of Church of St. James the Less along with his beloved wife Joanna. He'd given up robbery and repented his sins, though he never forgave his stepson and nephew for Joanna's murder.
