= Frank Geyer =

American police detective

Detective Frank P. Geyer
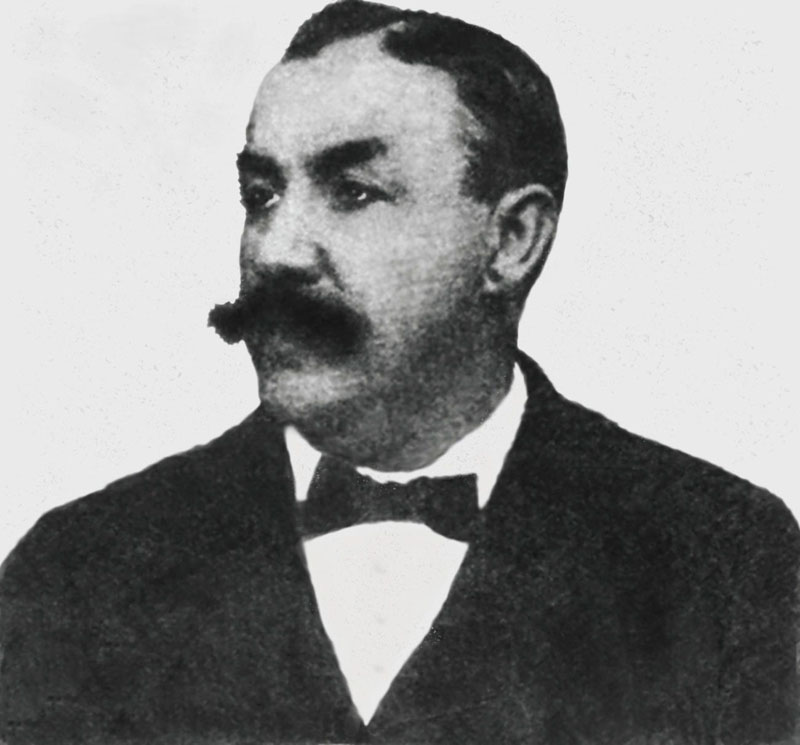
- Geyer in 1896
- Born: July 28, 1853; Philadelphia, Pennsylvania
- Died: October 4, 1918 (aged 65); Philadelphia, Pennsylvania
- Resting place: Hillside Cemetery, Roslyn, Pennsylvania
- Spouse: Mary Elizabeth Rilley (m. 1885)
- Children: 1 daughter
- Police career
- Department: City of Philadelphia Police Department
- Service years: 27 years at City of Philadelphia Police Department
- Rank: Detective, January 1888 until retirement, August 1903, appointed by Philadelphia Mayor Edwin Henry Fitler Special Officer, from February 1877 to January 1888 Patrolman, May 6, 1876 to February 1887, appointed by Mayor William Stokley
- Badge no.: 840, 887, and detective badge
- Other work: Author of Holmes-Pitezel case: a history of the greatest crime of the century and of the search for the missing Pitezel children, 1896 Invented "Shutter or Door Fastener," 1896 Invented "Safety-Lock," 1907 Founded "Frank P. Geyer Detective Agency," Philadelphia, PA, after retirement

Franklin P. Geyer (July 28, 1853 – October 4, 1918) was an American police detective from Philadelphia, Pennsylvania, best known for his investigation of H. H. Holmes, one of America's first serial killers. Geyer was a longtime city employee of the Philadelphia Police Department, and in 1894 was assigned to investigate the Holmes-Pitezel Case. He published the story in his book The Holmes-Pitezel Case: a history of the greatest crime of the century and of the search for the missing Pitezel children.

Son of Reuben K. Geyer and Camilla Buck, Frank Geyer died at the age of 65 due to La Grippe (Spanish Flu) and his funeral was attended by hundreds of policemen and detectives.

== Holmes–Pitezel case ==
H.H. Holmes's recorded crimes began in Chicago in 1893 when he opened a hotel called The World's Fair Hotel for the World's Columbian Exposition. The structure, built by Holmes, would later be known as the 'Murder Castle', as demonstrably false press accounts averred that labyrinthine constructions on the top two floors were used by Holmes to torture and kill numerous victims. Reports by the yellow press claimed the structure contained secret torture chambers, trap doors, gas chambers and a basement crematorium; none of these claims were true. Even a 1937 article in the Chicago Tribune described: "There were rooms that had no doors. There were doors that had no rooms. A mysterious house it was indeed -- a crooked house, a reflex of the builder's own distorted mind. In that house occurred dark and eerie deeds." While Holmes' "Murder Castle" is a total fabrication, it is true that he killed multiple times, partly in furtherance of an insurance fraud scheme. In doing so, Holmes left a complicated trail of evidence through several US states and the Canadian province of Ontario.

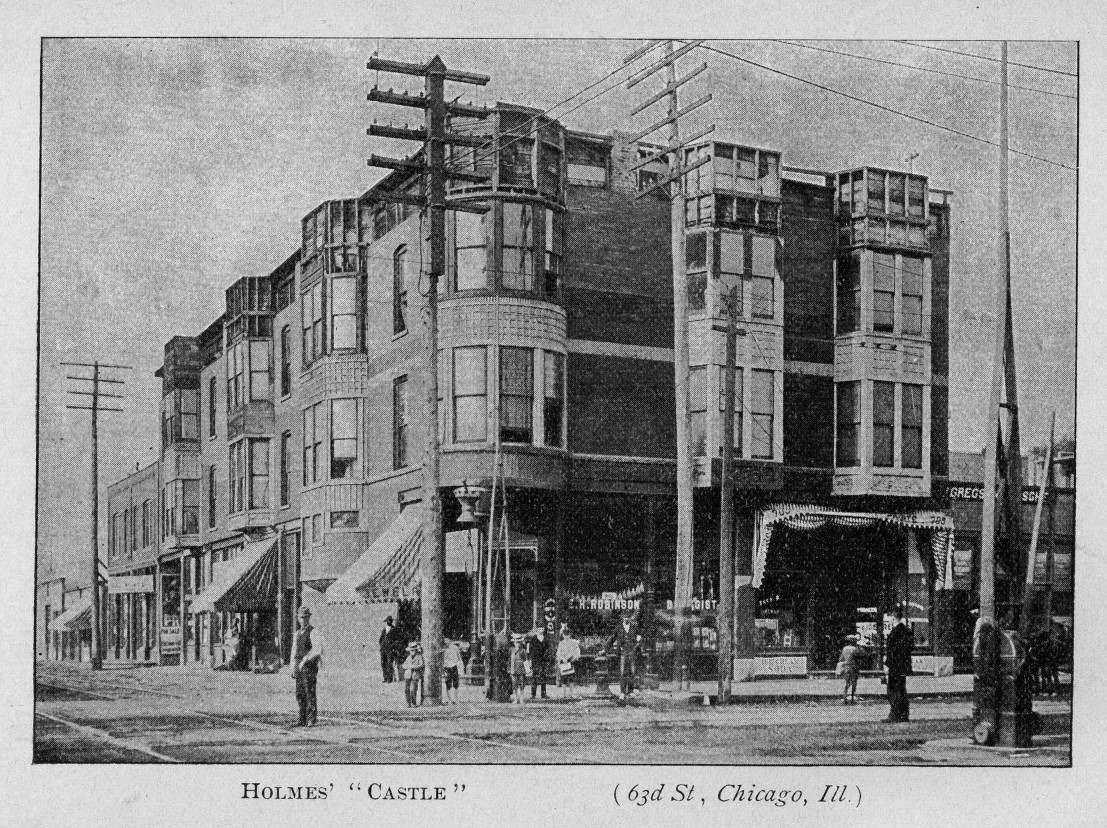
H. H. Holmes "Murder Castle"

Boston police inspectors and a Pinkerton detective apprehended Holmes in 1894 in Boston on a coroner's warrant for insurance fraud perpetrated in Philadelphia; however, Boston officials did not find the warrant sufficient to hold Holmes so they contacted Fort Worth, Texas for an outstanding warrant of horse theft. Holmes volunteered to be extradited to Philadelphia for the insurance fraud as he felt he would receive a much lighter sentence. Texas was notorious for rendering harsh sentences to horse thieves. The City of Philadelphia Police Department sent Detective Thomas Crawford to Boston to bring H. H. Holmes and his accomplice, Mrs. Carrie Pitezel, to Philadelphia for a trial.

Philadelphia city detective Frank Geyer was tasked with investigating and the trail led him through the Mid West and Toronto, Canada, where he found the remains of two of the Pitezel children. They were the children of Benjamin Pitezel, Holmes's former partner in crime, whom he had murdered to commit life insurance fraud. Pitezel, however, was only involved in fraud and had no knowledge of the murders.

The initial investigation was concerned with the insurance fraud but it soon became apparent that Holmes had killed Pitezel. In June 1895 Frank Geyer left Philadelphia to retrace Holmes's steps. His findings in Toronto led to further investigations of Holmes's Chicago property, which sealed his fate. Geyer used information from the unsent letters written by the Pitezel children which, for an unknown reason, were kept by Holmes. In Toronto, he found the bodies of Alice and Nellie Pitezel. He continued his search and found the burnt remains of Howard Pitezel, the third child, in a house Holmes had rented in Irvington, Indianapolis.

Holmes was found guilty of murder in the first degree and executed in May 1896 at the age of 34. Wildly exaggerated accounts have estimated Holmes' total number of victims at around 200, but with no sources to back up the figure. Erik Larson, who wrote extensively about Holmes in The Devil in the White City (2003), thought this was a gross exaggeration. Holmes himself confessed to 27 murders, although some of the people he claimed to have killed were still in fact alive. Modern thought links Holmes to the murders of Ben Pitezel and his three children, as well as very possibly (though by no means unquestionably) to five women he had various personal and business dealings with in the late 1880s and early 1890s, and who disappeared at various points and were never found. The murder of Ben Pitezel was the only murder for which Holmes was charged and convicted.

That same year Frank Geyer published his book detailing the case. In the book George S. Graham, District Attorney of Philadelphia, described the story as "one of the most marvellous [sic] stories of modern times".

Several popular books falsely claimed Detective Geyer's wife and twelve-year-old daughter died in a fire shortly after he was assigned to investigate H. H. Holmes and the three missing Pitezel children.

However, Geyer's beloved wife and daughter never died in a fire and continued to live well past his death in 1918.

== Other work ==
In 1896, Detective Geyer became an author and inventor. He authored the Holmes-Pitezel case: a history of the greatest crime of the century and of the search for the missing Pitezel children, which became an instant best seller. Shortly after its release, his "Shutter or Door Fastener" patent application was approved by the United States Patent Office on March 10, 1896, Patent No. 556,141. After 27 years with the City of Philadelphia Police Department, Geyer opened the Frank P. Geyer Detective Agency, located at 1328 Arch Street in Philadelphia and investigated high profile cases, mostly in the Pennsylvania and New Jersey areas. In 1907, he invented the "Safety-Lock for Pocket Books and Hand Bags, which was approved by the Patent Office December 3, 1907, Patent No. 872,619.

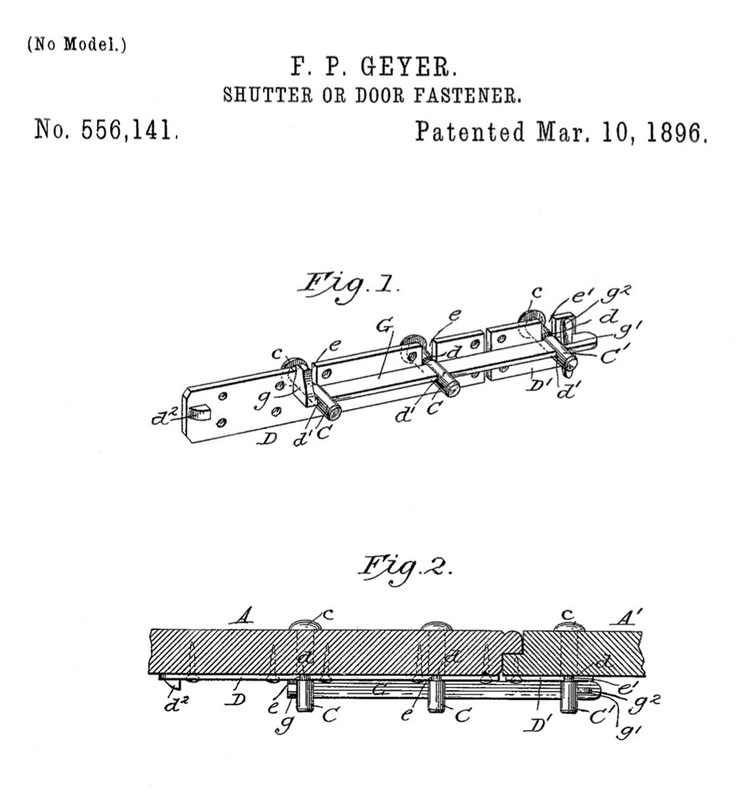
Detective Frank P. Geyer's Patent, 1896

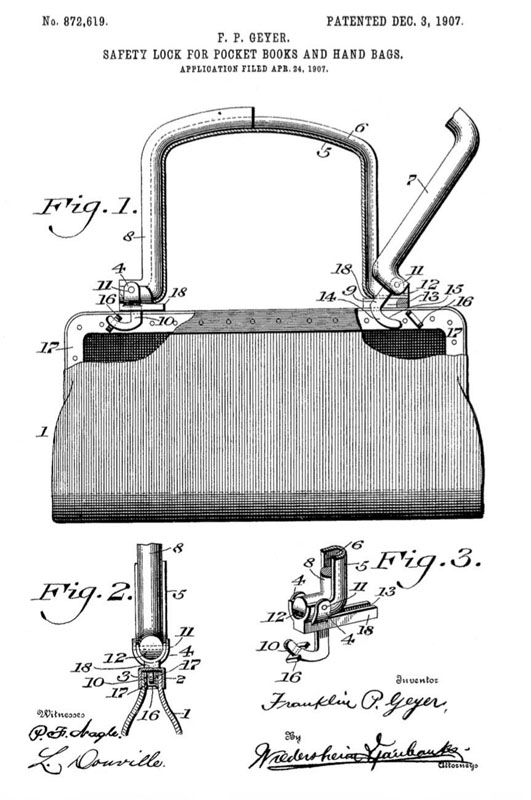
Detective Frank P. Geyer Patent, 1907
