= H. H. Holmes =

American con artist and serial killer (1861–1896)

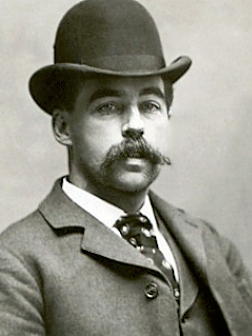
- Mugshot of Holmes
- Born: Herman Webster Mudgett; May 16, 1861; Gilmanton, New Hampshire, U.S.
- Status: Executed by hanging
- Died: May 7, 1896 (aged 34); Moyamensing Prison, Philadelphia, Pennsylvania, U.S.
- Resting place: Holy Cross Cemetery (Yeadon, Pennsylvania)
- Other names: See aliases & nicknames: H. H. Holmes; Alexander Bond; Harry Gordon; J.A. Judson; Robert E. Phelps; America's First Serial Killer; The Beast of Chicago; The Devil in the White City; The Torture Doctor; The Arch Fiend
- Education: University of Vermont (1879–1880); University of Michigan (1882–1884)
- Spouses: Clara Lovering (m. 1878); Myrta Belknap (m. 1886); Minnie Williams (m. 1893); Georgiana Yoke (m. 1894)
- Children: 2
- Conviction: First degree murder
- Penalty: Death

Details
- Victims: 9 (confirmed)
- Span of crimes: 1891 – 1894 (confirmed); 1886 – 1894 (suspected)
- Locations: Illinois; Indiana; Ontario; Pennsylvania
- Date apprehended: November 17, 1894

Herman Webster Mudgett (May 16, 1861 – May 7, 1896), better known as Dr. Henry Howard Holmes or H. H. Holmes and also known by the aliases Alexander Bond, Harry Gordon, J. A. Judson and Robert E. Phelps, was an American con artist and serial killer active between 1891 and 1894. By the time of his execution in 1896, Holmes had engaged in a lengthy criminal career that included insurance fraud, forgery, swindling, three or four bigamous marriages, horse theft and murder. Known as the Beast of Chicago, the Devil in the White City or the Torture Doctor, he committed his most notorious crimes in Chicago around the time of the World's Columbian Exposition in 1893.

Holmes was convicted and sentenced to death for the murder of Benjamin Pitezel, his accomplice in several of his cons. However, Holmes confessed to twenty-seven murders, including those of some people who were verifiably still alive. It is believed that he also killed three of Pitezel's children, as well as three mistresses, the child of one mistress and the sister of another. Holmes was hanged on May 7, 1896.

Much of the lore attached to Holmes concerns the so-called "Murder Castle", a three-story building he commissioned on W. 63rd Street in Chicago. Details about the building, along with many of his alleged crimes, are considered exaggerated or fabricated for sensationalistic tabloid pieces with some accounts estimating his body count could be as high as 133. Many of these inaccuracies have persisted due to the combination of ineffective police investigation and hyperbolic yellow journalism of the period, which are often cited as historical record. Official findings suggest that the W. 63rd Street property was used for business, and that the irregular architecture was a product of fraud, rather than being designed to fulfill violent fantasies.

Holmes gave various contradictory accounts of his life, initially claiming innocence, and later that he was possessed by Satan. His propensity for lying has made it difficult for researchers to ascertain the truth on the basis of his statements. For example, he claimed that Dr. Robert Leacock, a fellow medical school classmate, was one of his first murder victims, and that he killed him in 1886 for insurance money; however, Leacock died on October 5, 1889, in Watford, Ontario, Canada.

Since the 1990s, Holmes has often been described as the first serial killer in U.S. history. In his book about Holmes, author Adam Selzer writes: "Just killing several people isn't necessarily enough for most definitions [of a serial killer]. More often, it has to be a series of similar crimes, committed over a period of time, usually more to satisfy a psychological urge on the killer's part than any more practical motive." He adds: "The murders we can connect 'Holmes' to generally had a clear motive: someone knew too much, or was getting in his way, and couldn't be trusted. The murders weren't simply for love of bloodshed but a necessary part of furthering his swindling operation and protecting his lifestyle."

== Early life and education ==
H. H. Holmes was born as Herman Webster Mudgett on May 16, 1861, in Gilmanton, New Hampshire, the third child of Levi Horton Mudgett and Theodate Page Price, both of whom were descended from the first English settlers in the area. He had two older siblings, Ellen and Arthur, and one younger brother, Henry. As an adolescent, Holmes attended Phillips Exeter Academy before graduating high school with honors from Gilmanton Academy at age 16.

Holmes's parents were both devout Methodists. His father was from a farming family, and at times worked as a farmer, trader and house painter. He was also reportedly a heavy drinker who cruelly beat his children. Holmes also faced bullying by classmates due to his outstanding academic capabilities. In one incident, he was forced to stand in front of a human skeleton and put the skeleton's hands on his face in an effort to frighten him. Initially terrified, Holmes later discovered the experience to be intriguing and claimed that it helped him overcome his worries. Holmes subsequently developed an obsession with death as a result of the encounter, and began dissecting animals.

In 1879, Holmes enrolled at the University of Vermont for one year. In 1882 he transferred to the University of Michigan's Department of Medicine and Surgery. Despite his mediocre academic performance, Holmes graduated in June 1884. While enrolled, he worked in the anatomy lab under Professor William James Herdman, then the chief anatomy instructor, and the two were said to have been engaged in facilitating body snatching to supply medical cadavers. Holmes had apprenticed in New Hampshire under Nahum Wight, a noted advocate of human dissection. Years later, when Holmes was suspected of murder and claimed to be nothing but an insurance fraudster, he admitted to using cadavers to defraud life insurance companies several times in college.

In 1884, shortly after his separation from his first wife, Holmes moved to Mooers, New York. A rumor soon spread that he had been seen in the company of a little boy who later disappeared. Holmes claimed the boy went back to his home in Massachusetts. No investigation took place and Holmes quickly left town. He later traveled to Philadelphia and was hired as a keeper at Norristown State Hospital but quit after a few days. He then took a position at a drugstore in Philadelphia, but while he was working there a boy died after taking medicine that was purchased at the store. Holmes denied any involvement in the child's death and immediately left the city. Before moving to Chicago in August 1886, he changed his name to "Henry Howard Holmes" to avoid the possibility of being exposed by victims of his previous scams.

== Murders ==
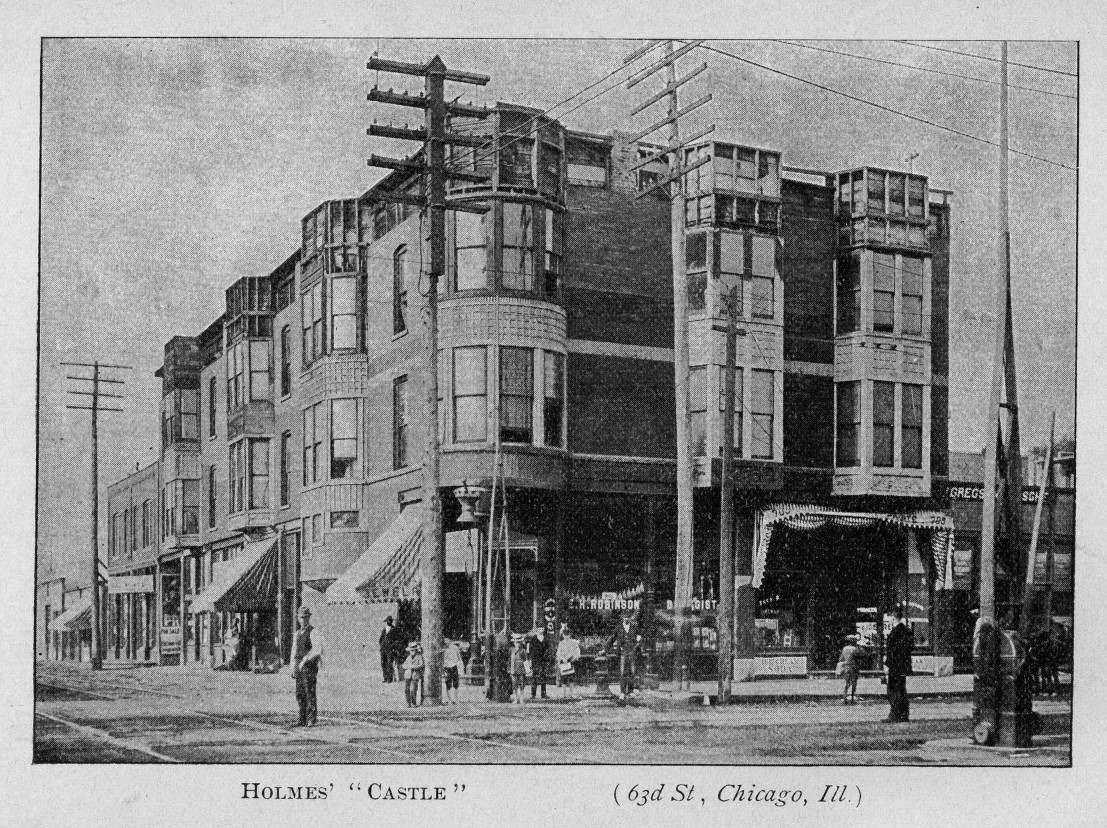
Holmes's Castle

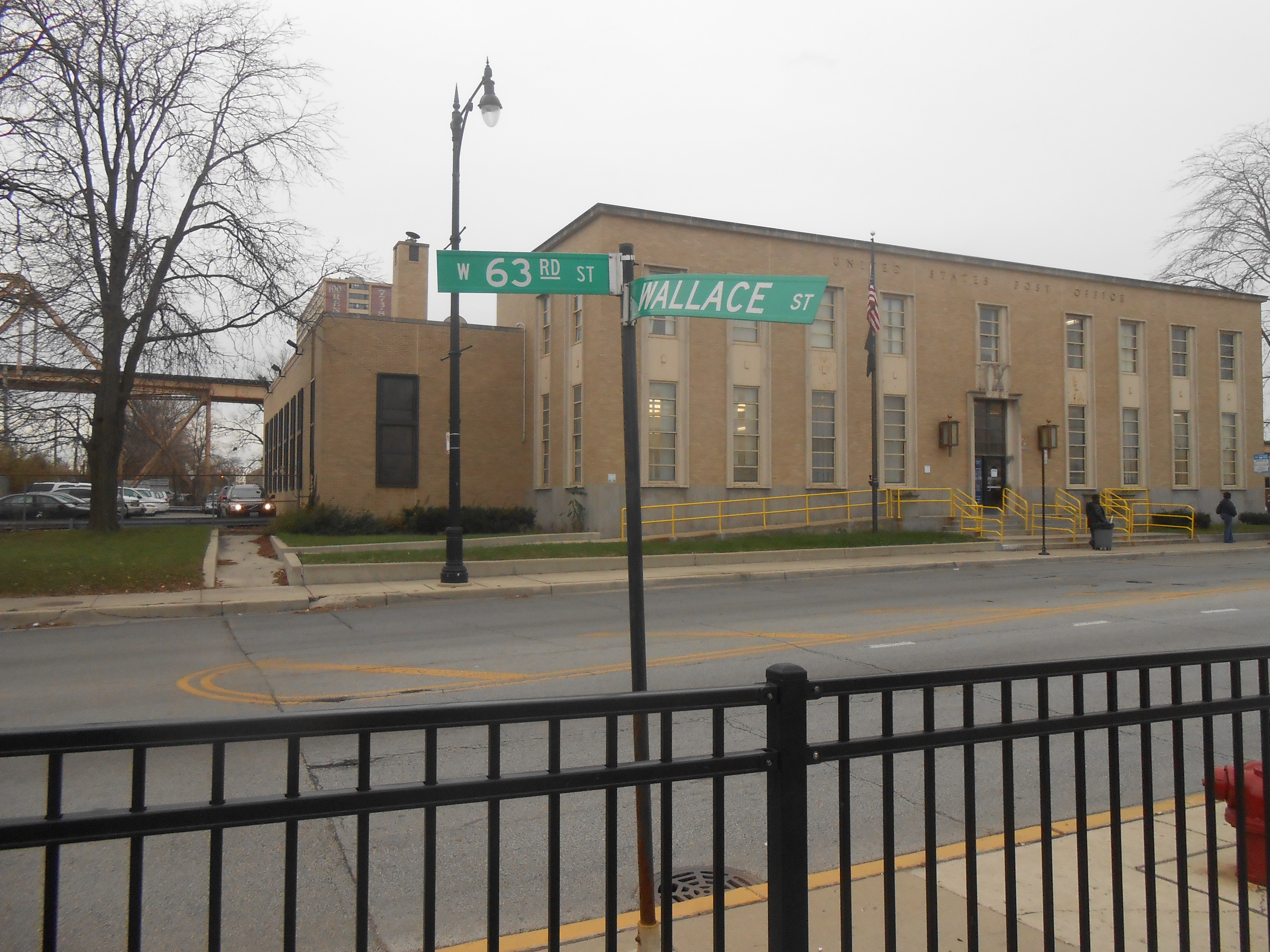
The Englewood post office at 63rd and Wallace Streets; Holmes's "Castle" site was just at the far left adjoining the post office building

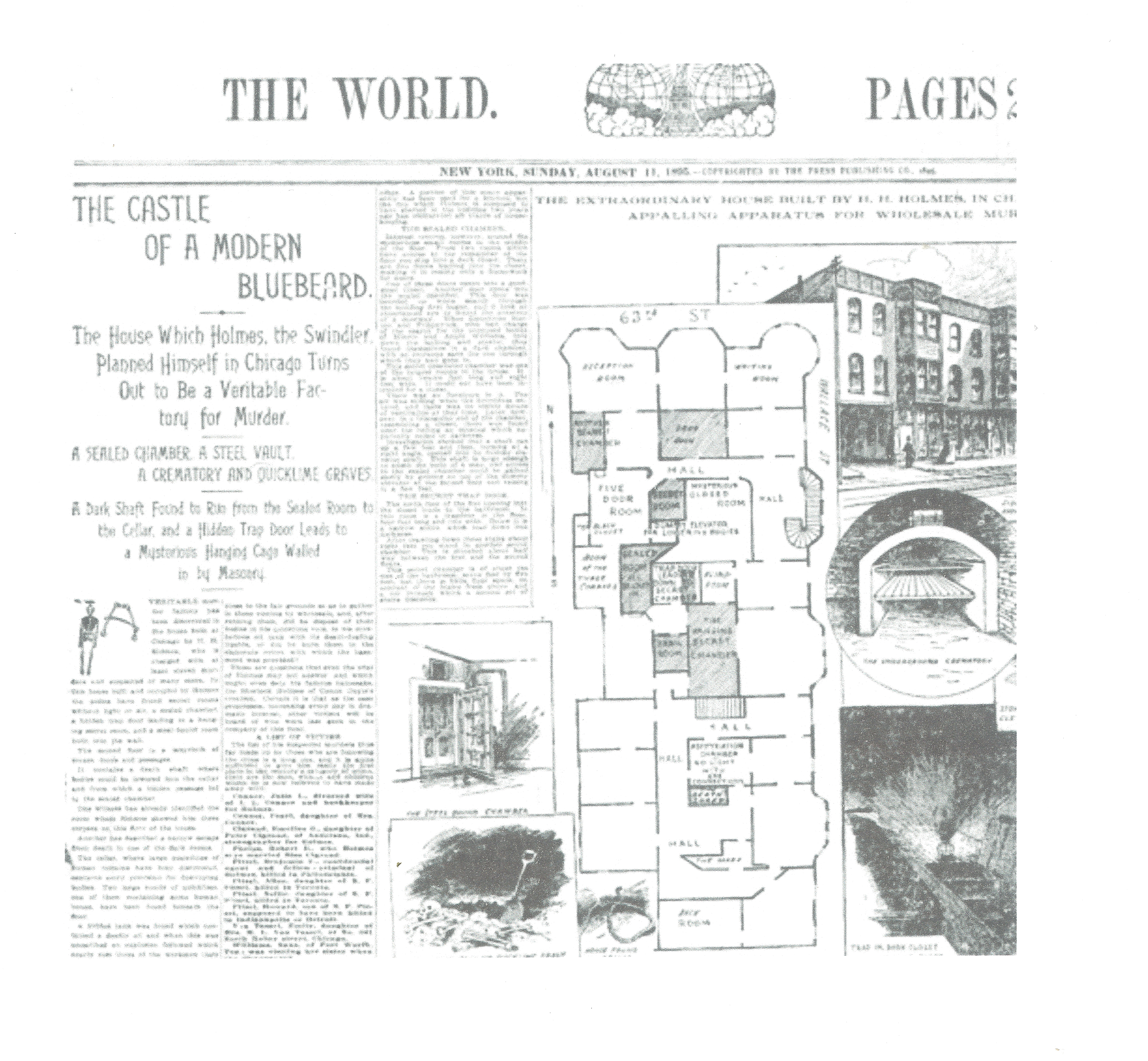
On August 11, 1895, Joseph Pulitzer's The World published a fictional floor plan of Holmes's "Murder Castle" with (left to right and top to bottom): a vault, a crematorium, a trapdoor in the floor, and a quicklime grave with bones.

Soon after his arrival in Chicago, Holmes came across a drugstore at the northwest corner of South Wallace Avenue and W. 63rd Street in the Englewood section of the city. The drugstore's owner, Elizabeth Holton, gave Holmes a job; he proved to be a hardworking employee, eventually buying the store.

Contrary to several accounts, Holmes did not kill Dr. E. S. Holton, the drugstore's original owner. Holmes purchased an empty lot across the street, where construction began in 1887 for a two-story mixed-use building, with apartments on the second floor and retail spaces, including a new drugstore, on the first. When he declined to pay the architects or the steel company, Aetna Iron and Steel, they took him to court in 1888. In 1892, Holmes added a third floor, telling investors and suppliers he intended to use it as a hotel during the upcoming World's Columbian Exposition.

Contemporary accounts report that Holmes built the hotel to lure tourists visiting the Exposition in order to kill them and sell their skeletons to nearby medical schools. Although he did have a history of selling stolen cadavers to medical schools, Holmes had acquired these wares through body snatching rather than murder. Likewise, there is no evidence that Holmes ever murdered Exposition-goers on the premises. The yellow press of the period labeled the building as Holmes's "Murder Castle", claiming the structure contained secret torture chambers, trapdoors, gas chambers and a basement crematorium; none of these sensationalised claims were true.

Other accounts stated that the hotel was made up of over a hundred rooms and laid out like a maze, with doors opening into brick walls, windowless rooms and dead-end staircases. In reality, the third-floor hotel was moderately sized, largely unremarkable and uncompleted due to Holmes's disputes with the builders. It did contain some hidden rooms, but they were used for hiding furniture Holmes bought on credit and did not intend to pay for. Holmes did not kill an alleged "Castle" victim, Miss Kate Durkee, who turned out to be very much alive. In his confession, he stated that his usual method of killing was to suffocate his victims using various means, including an overdose of chloroform, overexposure to lighting gas fumes and trapping them in an airless vault. Holmes also claimed to have starved victims and to have burned them alive in his "castle".

Holmes's hotel was gutted by a fire started by an unknown arsonist shortly after his arrest, but was largely rebuilt and used as a post office until 1938. Besides his infamous "Murder Castle", Holmes also owned a one-story factory which he claimed was to be used for glass bending. It is unclear if the factory furnace was ever used for this purpose; it was speculated to have been used to destroy incriminating evidence of Holmes's crimes.

=== Presumed murders ===
A newspaper account of Holmes's confession, including hand-drawn illustrations of the judge at his trial and ten of his suspected victims.

- Holmes's mistress, 31-year-old Julia Smythe, was the wife of Dr. Laurence Conner, who had moved into his building and began working at his drugstore's jewelry counter. After Conner found out about Smythe's affair with Holmes, he quit his job and moved away, leaving Smythe and their 5-year-old daughter, Pearl Conner, behind. Smythe gained custody of Pearl and remained at the hotel, continuing her relationship with Holmes. Julia and Pearl both disappeared on Christmas Eve of 1891. Holmes initially claimed that Julia had left unexpectedly to visit her dying sister but then changed his story and said that she had fled her former husband. Ultimately, Holmes later claimed that Julia had actually died during an abortion. Despite his medical background, Holmes was unlikely to be experienced in carrying out abortions, and mortality from such a procedure was high at that time. Holmes then claimed to have poisoned Pearl, likely to hide the circumstances of her mother's death. A partial skeleton, possibly of a child around Pearl's age, was found when excavating Holmes's cellar. Pearl's father was a key witness at Holmes's trial in Chicago.
- 23-year-old Emeline Cigrand began working in Holmes's building in May 1892 and worked for him for six months. Holmes reportedly hired Cigrand as a secretary due to her connection to a doctor who peddled a "vaccine" that allegedly cured alcoholism. Those who saw Cigrand in the weeks before her disappearance noted that she appeared to have lost interest in Holmes and their relationship. Cigrand was last seen in December 1892. Her parents were informed that she had left to marry a man named "Robert Phelps". Authorities hypothesized that she was pregnant by Holmes, possibly being a victim of another failed abortion that he tried to cover up. Her empty luggage trunk was sent back to her mother in Anderson, Indiana; her skeleton was found by police at the home of a Chicago physician with the help of M. G. Chappel, who admitted having articulated three skeletons for Holmes.
- In early 1893, a 24-year-old one-time actress, Wilhelmina "Minnie" Williams, moved to Chicago. Holmes claimed to have met her in an employment office, though it is believed that he had actually met her in Boston several years earlier while he was then going by the alias "Harry Gordon". Holmes offered her a job at the hotel as his personal stenographer, and she accepted. He persuaded Williams to transfer the deed to her property in Fort Worth, Texas, to a man named "Alexander Bond", which was an alias of Holmes. In April 1893, Williams transferred the deed, with Holmes serving as the notary. Holmes later signed the deed over to Pitezel, giving him the alias "Benton T. Lyman". In the following month, Holmes and Williams, presenting themselves as husband and wife, rented an apartment in Chicago's Lincoln Park neighborhood. Minnie's younger sister, 18-year-old Anna "Nannie" Williams, came to visit, and on July 5, 1893, she wrote to her aunt that she planned to accompany "Brother Harry" to Europe. In it, she signed off with the message: "Brother Harry [Holmes] says you need never trouble any more about me, financially or otherwise. He and sister will see to me. I hope our hard days are over." Neither Minnie nor Nannie were seen alive again, and Holmes used Minnie's name in future scams.

=== Other suspected victims ===
- A 68-year-old creditor of Holmes named John DeBrueil died of apoplexy on April 17, 1891, in the "Castle" drugstore. DeBrueil collapsed and died shortly after Holmes poured a "black liquid" down his throat, according to a witness. Foul play was not suspected; in 1895, it was determined that DeBrueil's life had been insured, and that Holmes had profited from his death.
- In 1891, Emily Van Tassel disappeared after working at Holmes's drugstore; Holmes spoke of her in his confession. In 1897, Tassel's name was cited in a list of suspected victims and her mother believed she was a possible victim.
- "Dr. Russler" had an office in the "Castle" and went missing in 1892; Holmes mentioned killing Russler in his confession.
- Kitty Kelly, a stenographer for Holmes, also went missing in 1892.
- John Davis of Greenville, Pennsylvania, went to visit the World's Columbian Exposition and vanished. In 1920, he was declared legally dead.
- Harry Walker of Greensburg, Indiana, went missing in November 1893. He was alleged to have insured his life to Holmes for $20,000 and wrote to friends that he was working for Holmes in Chicago.
- Holmes confessed to taking a man named George Thomas out to a Mississippi swamp on the Tombigbee River in June 1894, killed him and disposed of the body with assistance from Pitezel. Holmes confessed to the murder to his second wife.
- Baltimore resident Milford Cole disappeared after receiving a telegram from Holmes to come to Chicago in July 1894.
- Lucy Burbank's bankbook was found with human hair in a chimney flue at the "Castle" in 1895.
- Holmes is alleged to have killed two people in Lake County, Illinois, in the 1890s. Their deaths were confirmed in 1919, twenty-three years after his execution, when the remains of an unknown man and woman were found on a farm.

== Confessed killings ==
Of the twenty-seven killings to which Holmes confessed, only eight are confirmed, with one other considered probable.

- Dr. Robert Leacock was allegedly murdered by Holmes in 1886 for insurance money, as detailed earlier in this article. However, Leacock actually died of natural causes on October 5, 1889, in Watford, Ontario, Canada. – Claim disproven.
- "Rodgers", of Morgantown, West Virginia, was allegedly killed by Holmes while boarding there in 1888. However, the Wheeling News-Register reported that no such murder ever took place. – Claim disproven.
- "Lizzie", a domestic worker at the hotel, was allegedly smothered in the vault because Holmes believed a janitor was too interested in her. Holmes later claimed she was still alive. – Claim unconfirmed.
- Another victim named Rodgers, this one a banker from North Wisconsin, was allegedly murdered by Holmes in 1891 with help from an unnamed accomplice. No evidence supported this claim, and there were no corresponding disappearances from North Wisconsin. – Claim highly suspect.
- The murders of Julia Conner and her four-year-old daughter, Pearl Conner, are often stated to have taken place on Christmas Eve, 1891, and to have included Julia's unborn child. However, while the murders of Julia and Pearl are confirmed, this version of events was never stated by Holmes himself. – Murders confirmed.
- 24-year-old Virginia Anna Betts died suddenly in her home one block from the hotel on February 8, 1892, officially from apoplexy with complications from heart disease. Holmes claimed to have poisoned her, either to cancel a debt, or in the hope of being able to watch her die (which, in the event, he was denied). – Murder probable.
- Emeline Cigrand of Dwight, Illinois, who worked at the "Castle" as a stenographer, was murdered by Holmes in 1892. – Murder confirmed.
- Sarah Cook and her unborn child, along with Cook's niece, Mrs. Mary Haracamp or Haverkamp of Hamilton, Ontario, were allegedly smothered in the vault. However, the Omaha Daily Bee reported that no person by the name Haverkamp was ever known in Hamilton. – Claim unconfirmed.
- Holmes claimed to have lured Rosine Van Jassand (also named as Anna Van Tassaud) into his fruit store, where he kept her for some time before poisoning her. The victim's description seems to correspond to 16-year-old Emily Van Tassel, who disappeared in 1892. – Murder highly likely.
- Robert Latimer, a janitor at the hotel who knew of Holmes's insurance scams, was allegedly murdered by Holmes to prevent him from talking. The Chicago Daily Inter Ocean reported that authorities had encountered someone else by that name, a Robert Latimer who worked as a flagman at a nearby railroad crossing. Holmes later included Latimer among those still living in his own story. – Claim unconfirmed.
- 22-year-old Eva Gertrud Conner of Muscatine, Iowa, died July 18, 1892. She was the sister-in-law of Julia Conner, and worked for Holmes for only three weeks before leaving for home, where she died seven weeks later of neuralgia of the heart. Holmes claimed to have poisoned her, and, while the timing of Eva's death makes his claim unlikely, it is possible that he gave her something that she did not take until later. – Murder unlikely, but not impossible.
- Kate Durkee of Omaha, Nebraska, was allegedly killed by Holmes in 1892. However, she later turned up very much alive, stating that she "was never killed by Holmes or anyone else". – Claim disproven.
- L. Warner, owner of a glass factory bought by Holmes, was allegedly burned alive by Holmes in the basement kiln. However, Warner was soon found to be alive, having become a traveling salesman. – Claim disproven.
- An unnamed wealthy woman was allegedly killed in late 1893. The woman was a tenant of Holmes and was supposedly killed so he could gain control over an unnamed accomplice, who lived with the woman. There is insufficient information to confirm or deny these events, though there is a remote possibility that the victim was Minnie Williams and the accomplice was Benjamin Pitezel. – Claim not proven.
- Wilhelmina "Minnie" Williams and Anna "Nannie" Williams were murdered by Holmes in 1893. In his confession, Holmes claimed he killed Minnie in Momence, Illinois, poisoning and burying her there. When the hotel was investigated, burned clothing believed to have belonged to Minnie was found. John Davis of Greenville, Pennsylvania, who came to Chicago to visit the Exposition and vanished, was declared legally dead in 1920. The remains found in Lake County in 1919 may have belonged to Nannie and Davis. – Murders confirmed; Davis connection not proven.
- An unnamed man who was a tenant of Holmes was allegedly killed during the World's Columbian Exposition, held from May 1 to October 30, 1893. Although Holmes provided additional details on how to find the man's name, no such victim was ever identified and no body was ever found. The confession might refer to Harry Walker of Greensburg, Indiana, who disappeared in November 1893. Walker allegedly insured his life to Holmes for $20,000 and wrote to friends that he was working for Holmes in Chicago. – Claim unconfirmed; Walker connection possible.
- Holmes claimed to have murdered Baldwin Hanscomb Williams, brother of Minnie and Nannie Williams, in 1894. However, he later claimed that Baldwin had died in a train accident in 1893, before Minnie joined him in Chicago. A notice in the Leadville Daily and Evening Chronicle confirmed the latter timing of Baldwin's death. – Claim disproven.
- Holmes claimed to have lured a speculator named Charles Cole (first name also given as Wilfred or Milford) to the "Castle" in 1894, where an unnamed accomplice killed Cole with a gas pipe. However, he later claimed that Cole was still alive. – Claim unconfirmed.

=== Pitezel killings ===
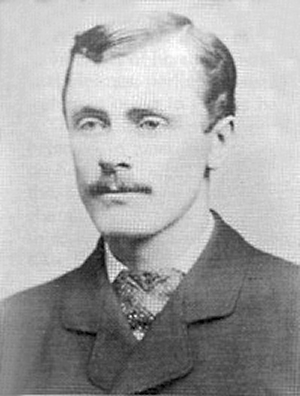
Benjamin Pitezel

April 12, 1896, edition of William Randolph Hearst's The Journal with Holmes's confession

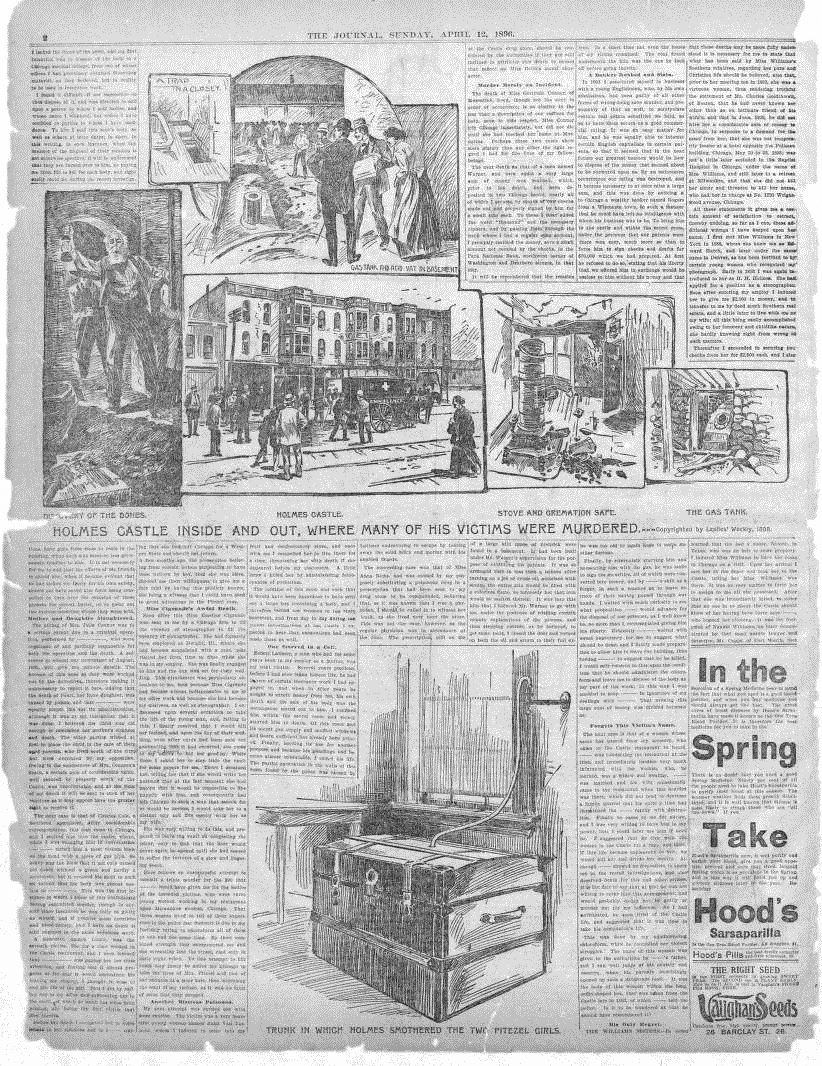
The April 12, 1896, edition of New York Journal, showing the exterior and interior of Holmes's "Castle"; the bottom picture is the trunk he used to murder the Pitezel sisters.

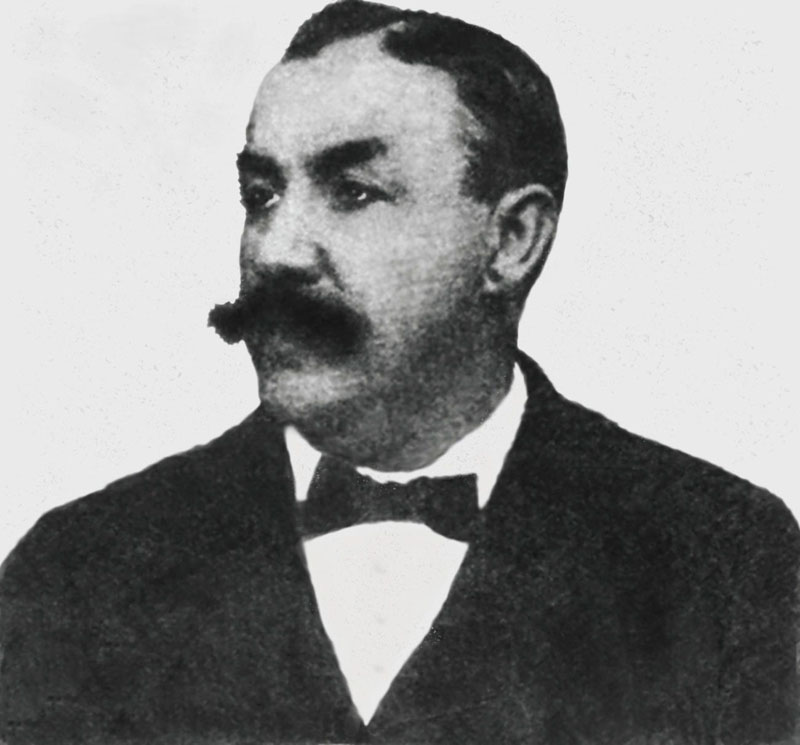
Philadelphia Police Department detective Frank Geyer, who investigated Holmes

While working in the Chemical Bank building on Dearborn Street, Holmes met and became close friends with 38-year-old Benjamin Freelon Pitezel, a carpenter with a criminal past who was exhibiting a coal bin he had invented in the same building. Holmes used Pitezel as his accomplice for several criminal schemes. A district attorney later described Pitezel as "Holmes's tool... his creature." With insurance companies pressing to prosecute him for arson, Holmes left Chicago in July 1894. He reappeared in Fort Worth, Texas, where he had inherited property from the Williams sisters at the intersection of modern-day Commerce Street and 2nd Street. Here, he once again attempted to build an incomplete structure without paying his suppliers and contractors.

In July 1894, Holmes was arrested and briefly jailed on the charge of selling mortgaged goods in St. Louis, Missouri. He was promptly bailed out, but while in jail he struck up a conversation with a convicted outlaw named Marion Hedgepeth, who was serving a twenty-five-year sentence. Holmes had concocted a plan to swindle an insurance company out of $10,000 by taking out a policy on himself and then faking his death. Holmes promised Hedgepeth a $500 commission in exchange for the name of a lawyer who could be trusted. Holmes was directed to St. Louis attorney Jeptha Howe. Howe thought Holmes's scheme was brilliant and agreed to participate. Nevertheless, Holmes's plan to fake his own death failed when the insurance company became suspicious and refused to pay. Holmes did not press the claim; instead, he concocted a similar plan with Pitezel.

Pitezel agreed to fake his own death so that his wife could collect on a $10,000 life insurance policy, which he was to split with Holmes and Howe. The scheme, which was to take place in Philadelphia, called for Pitezel to set himself up as an inventor under the name "B. F. Perry" and then be killed and disfigured in a lab explosion. Holmes was to find an appropriate cadaver to play the role of Pitezel. Instead, Holmes killed Pitezel on September 4, 1894, knocking him unconscious with chloroform and setting his body on fire with benzene. Pitezel's body, found at 1326 Callowhill Street, was initially interred in a potter's field after a coroner's jury returned a verdict of accidental death; it was only three weeks later that Howe arrived in Philadelphia to claim the $10,000 insurance payout from the Fidelity Mutual Insurance Company, bringing Holmes with him to identify the body, which Holmes and Pitezel's unsuspecting wife, Carrie Alice Canning, both confirmed as that of Pitezel. The ploy was successful and Holmes collected the insurance payout on the basis of the genuine Pitezel corpse.

Holmes then manipulated Canning into believing that Pitezel was alive and allowing three of her five children to be placed in Holmes's custody. The three children who were placed under his care were 13-year-old Alice Pitezel, 9-year-old Nellie Pitezel and 7-year-old Howard Robert Pitezel. Holmes and the three Pitezel children traveled throughout the Northeastern United States and into Canada. He simultaneously escorted Canning along a parallel route, all the while using various aliases and falsely telling Carrie that Pitezel was hiding in London, as well as lying to her about the true whereabouts of her three missing children. In Detroit, just before entering Canada, the mother and children were separated by only a few city blocks.

In an even more audacious move, Holmes was staying at another location with his current wife, who was unaware of the whole affair. In his confession, he implied Pitezel was still alive after he used the chloroform on him, before he set him on fire. However, forensic evidence presented at Holmes's later trial showed chloroform had been administered after Pitezel's death (a fact of which the insurance company was unaware), presumably to stage a suicide to exonerate Holmes should he be charged with murder. Holmes confessed to murdering Alice and Nellie on October 25, 1894, by forcing them into a large trunk and locking them inside. He drilled a hole in the lid of the trunk and put one end of a hose through the hole, attaching the other end to a gas line to asphyxiate the girls. Holmes buried their nude bodies in the cellar of his rental house at 16 St. Vincent Street in Toronto. (Note: Neither the building nor the street exist any longer. The site of the former house is now part of a condo on the west side of Bay Street, north of College Street.)

Frank Geyer, a Philadelphia Police Department detective assigned to investigate Holmes and find the missing children, began tracing Holmes's steps in June 1895 and found the decomposed bodies of the two Pitezel girls in Toronto. The detective wrote: "The deeper we dug, the more horrible the odor became, and when we reached the depth of three feet, we discovered what appeared to be the bone of the forearm of a human being." Geyer also discovered unsent letters written by the Pitezel children that Holmes had kept. This information led to further investigations of Holmes's Chicago property and ultimately led Geyer to Indianapolis, where Holmes had rented a home in the Irvington neighborhood. Holmes was reported to have visited a local pharmacy to purchase the drugs which he used to kill Howard Pitezel on October 10, 1894, and a repair shop to sharpen the knives he used to chop up the child's body before he burned it. The boy's teeth and bones were discovered in the home's chimney.

== Capture and execution ==
Holmes's murder spree finally ended when he was arrested in Boston on November 17, 1894, after being tracked there from Philadelphia by the private Pinkerton National Detective Agency. He was held on an outstanding warrant for horse theft in Texas because the authorities had become more suspicious at this point and Holmes appeared poised to flee the country with his unsuspecting third wife. (Note: Holmes was thus simultaneously moving three groups of people across the country, each ignorant of the other groups.)

In July 1895, following the discovery of Alice and Nellie's bodies, the Chicago Police Department and journalists began investigating Holmes's former hotel in Englewood, now locally referred to as the "Castle". Detectives and a medical expert found a trail of human blood leading from Julia Conner's dining room through a dark chamber to a secret trapdoor and down an elevator shaft into the basement, where a clot of blood mixed with human hair was discovered; child's underwear stained with blood, a blood-soaked handkerchief and a rope with blood in its knots were also recovered. In the janitor's private rooms, detectives found two theatrical trunks bearing the painted-over initials "M.R.W.", identified as belonging to Minnie R. Williams. Separately, investigators obtained confirmation that Pitezel had operated in Philadelphia under the name Robert E. Phelps, and Emeline Cigrand's father wrote from Indiana to inquire about a photograph of his daughter found at the "Castle", which investigators identified as a facsimile from the Cigrand family album.

Though many sensational claims were made, no evidence was found which could have convicted Holmes in Chicago. There was only very circumstantial evidence of murders committed inside the "Castle": a piece of human bone possibly from Julia Conner; remains of a child, possibly Pearl Conner; a burned gold watch chain and burned dress buttons—apparently belonging to Minnie; and a tuft of human female hair found in a chimney flue. Thus Holmes would be tried for the murder of Pitezel in Philadelphia, which had the best chance for success.

In October 1895, Holmes was put on trial for the murder of Pitezel, and was found guilty and sentenced to death. By then, it was evident Holmes had also murdered the three missing Pitezel children. Following his conviction, he confessed to twenty-seven murders in Chicago, Indianapolis and Toronto, and six attempted murders. Holmes was paid $7,500 by Hearst newspapers in exchange for his confession. While writing his confessions in prison, Holmes mentioned how drastically his facial appearance had changed since his imprisonment.

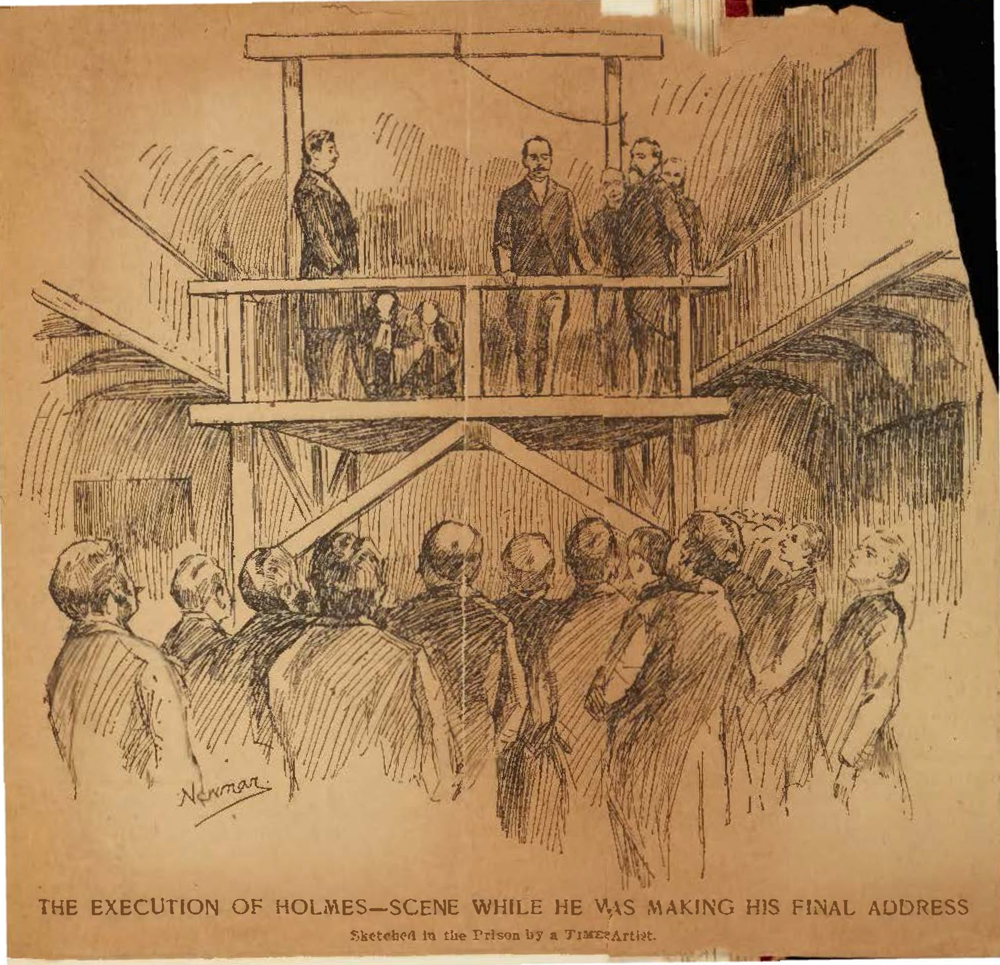
Sketch of Holmes during his execution while he was making his final address.

On May 7, 1896, Holmes was hanged at Moyamensing Prison. Until the moment of his death, he remained calm and amiable, showing very few signs of fear, anxiety or depression. Despite this, he asked for his coffin to be encased in concrete and buried ten feet deep, concerned that body snatchers would steal his body and use it for dissection. Holmes's neck did not break; he instead strangled to death slowly, twitching for over fifteen minutes before being pronounced dead.

Upon his execution, Holmes's body was interred in an unmarked grave at Holy Cross Cemetery, a Catholic cemetery in Yeadon, Pennsylvania. On New Year's Eve 1909, Hedgepeth, who had been pardoned for informing on Holmes, was shot and killed by Chicago police officer Edward Jaburek during a hold-up at a bar. On March 7, 1914, the Chicago Tribune reported that, with the death of Patrick Quinlan, the former janitor of the "Castle", "the mysteries of Holmes's castle" would remain unexplained. Quinlan had committed suicide by taking strychnine. His body was found in his bedroom with a note that read: "I couldn't sleep." His surviving relatives claimed he had been "haunted" for several months and was suffering from hallucinations.

The "Castle" itself was damaged by a fire in August 1895. Two men were seen entering the back of the building at 9 p.m. About half an hour later, they were seen exiting the building and rapidly running away. Following several explosions, the castle went up in flames. Afterwards, investigators found a half-empty gas can underneath the back steps of the building. The building survived the fire and remained in use until it was torn down in 1938. The site is currently occupied by the Englewood branch of the United States Postal Service.

In 2017, during allegations Holmes had escaped execution, his body was exhumed for testing led by Janet Monge of the University of Pennsylvania Museum of Archaeology and Anthropology. Due to his coffin being encased in concrete, his body was found to not have decomposed normally. His clothes were almost perfectly preserved and his moustache was found to be intact. The body was positively identified by his teeth as being that of Holmes. He was then reburied.

== Personal life ==
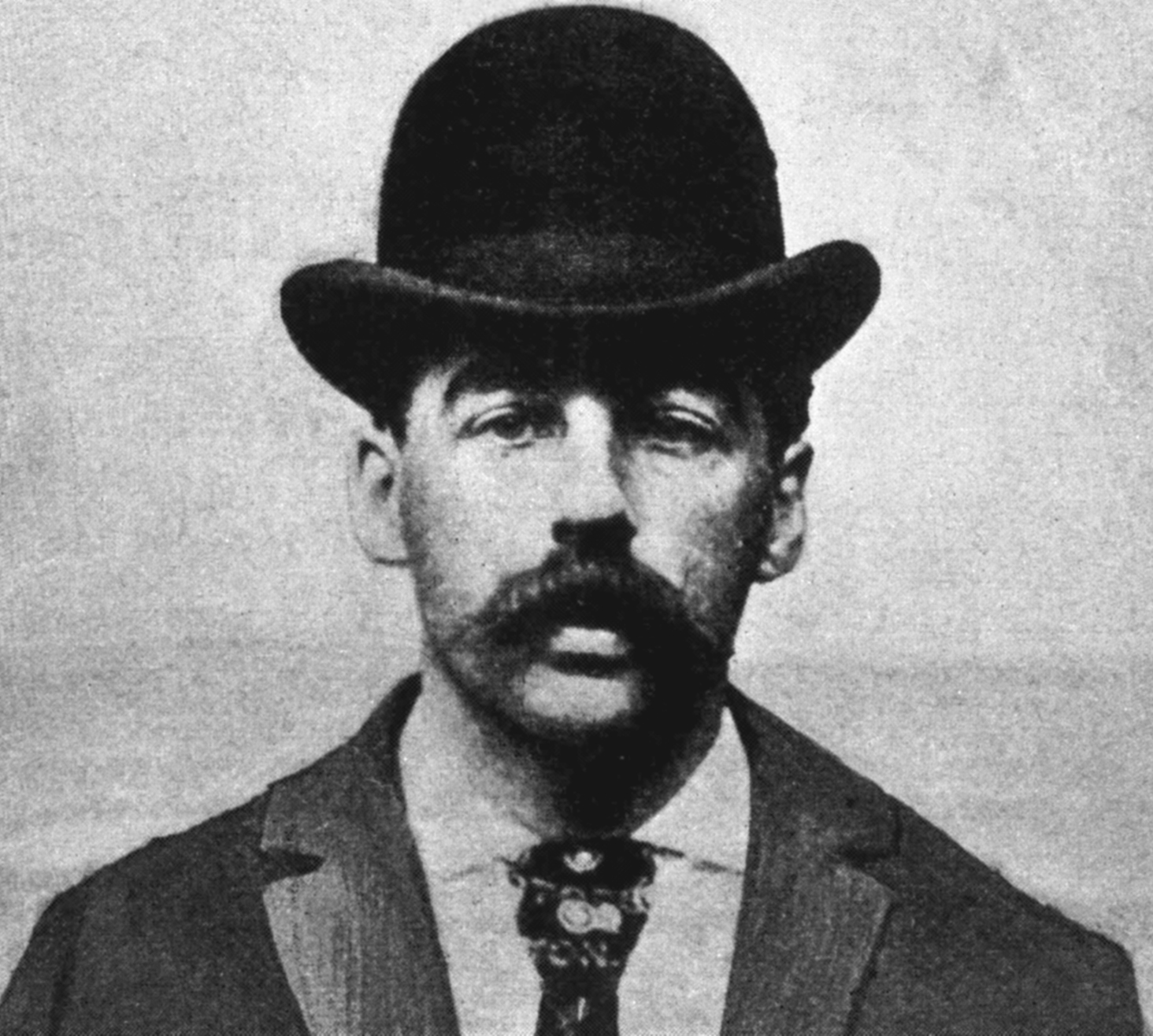
Holmes in an additional mugshot

On July 4, 1878, Holmes married Clara Lovering in Alton, New Hampshire. They had one son, Robert Lovering Mudgett (February 3, 1880 – November 3, 1956), who was born in Loudon. Robert went on to become a certified public accountant and served as city manager of Orlando, Florida. Holmes eventually enrolled in the University of Vermont in Burlington at age 18 but was dissatisfied with the school and left after one year.

Housemates later recalled that Holmes was physically violent with Clara, and in 1884, before his graduation, she moved back to New Hampshire and had little contact with him afterward. In late 1886, while still legally married to Clara, Holmes married 24-year-old Myrta Belknap in Minneapolis, Minnesota. He filed for divorce from Clara a few weeks after marrying Myrta, alleging infidelity on her part. The claims could not be proven and the suit went nowhere. Surviving paperwork indicated that Clara probably was never even informed of the suit. In any case, the divorce was never finalized; it was dismissed on June 4, 1891, on the grounds of "want of prosecution".

Holmes had one daughter with Myrta, Lucy Theodate Holmes (July 4, 1889 – December 29, 1956), who was born in the Englewood neighborhood of Chicago. Lucy later became a public schoolteacher. Holmes lived with Myrta and Lucy in Wilmette, Illinois, and spent most of his time in Chicago tending to business. In May 1893, he represented his mistress Wilhelmina "Minnie" Williams as his wife. He married Georgiana Yoke on January 17, 1894, in Denver, Colorado, while still married to both Clara and Myrta.

== In popular culture ==
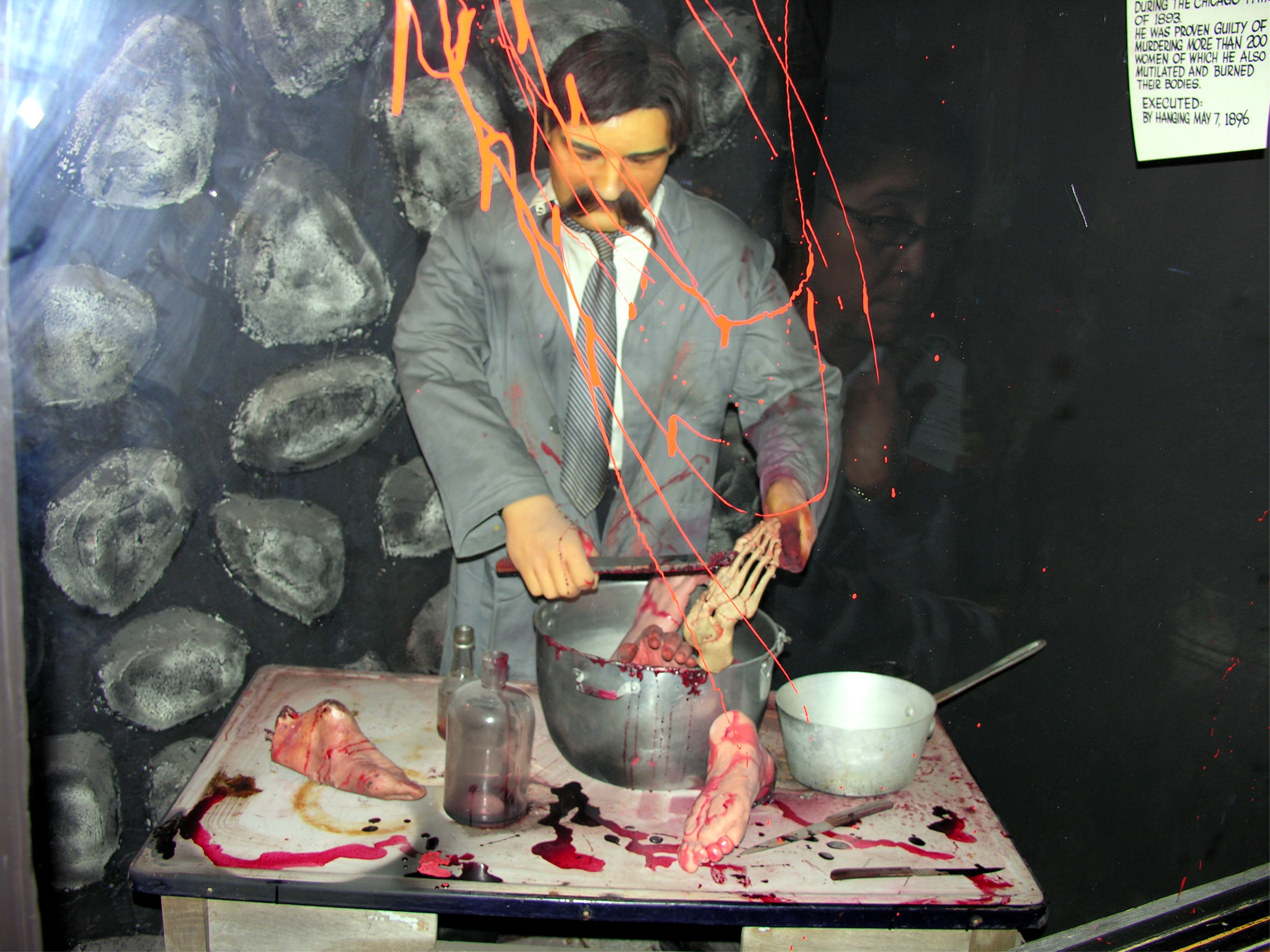
H. H. Holmes at the Criminals Hall of Fame wax museum in Niagara Falls, Ontario

The Sherlock Holmes story "The Adventure of the Retired Colourman" (1927) features a killer who gasses his victims in a strongroom. The novel American Gothic (1974), by horror writer Robert Bloch, is a fictionalized version of the story of Holmes.

In 2015, a film adaptation of The Devil in the White City, starring Leonardo DiCaprio and directed by Martin Scorsese, was to begin filming. In 2019, Scorsese and DiCaprio were to be executive producers in a television version to have been released by Paramount TV and Hulu, but Hulu has since dropped the project, leaving the show's future undecided. Holmes was portrayed by Stephen Aberle in the second season of Supernatural, episode "No Exit", and by Joel Johnstone in the first season of Timeless, episode: "The World's Columbian Exposition". Holmes's hotel makes an appearance in the game The Dark Pictures Anthology: The Devil in Me, with various references to Holmes himself.

In 2026, American Murder Song released “H. H. Holmes (Gluttony)”, a song based on Holmes and the murders attributed to him.

== See also ==
- List of serial killers in the United States
- List of homicides in Illinois
