= Philadelphia Police Department =

Police agency in Philadelphia, US

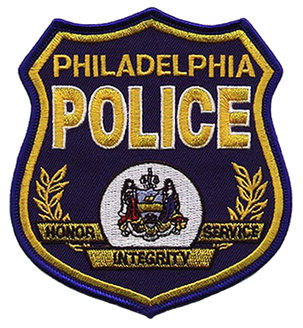
- Patch

- Badge

- Flag of Philadelphia
- Abbreviation: PPD
- Motto: Honor, Integrity, Service

Agency overview
- Formed: 1854; 172 years ago
- Annual budget: $782,000,000 (2023)

Jurisdictional structure
- Operations jurisdiction: Philadelphia, Pennsylvania, United States
- General nature: Local civilian police

Operational structure
- Headquarters: 400 N. Broad Street, Philadelphia, Pennsylvania, 19103
- Police officers: ▼5,021 of 6,500 (2025)
- Mayor of Philadelphia responsible: Cherelle Parker
- Agency executives: Kevin J. Bethel, Commissioner; John M. Stanford Jr., First Deputy Commissioner, Field Operations; Francis Healy, Deputy Commissioner, Chief of Staff and Legal Affairs; Michael Cram, Deputy Commissioner, Patrol Operations; Frank Vanore, Deputy Commissioner, Investigations; James J. Kelly III, Deputy Commissioner, Special Operations Partnerships

Facilities
- Small boats: 4
- Helicopters: 4

Website
- Official Site

The Philadelphia Police Department (PPD, Philly PD, or Philly Police) is the police agency responsible for law enforcement and investigations within the County and City of Philadelphia. The PPD is one of the oldest municipal police agencies, fourth-largest police force and sixth-largest non-federal law enforcement agency in the United States. Since records were first kept in 1828, at least 289 PPD officers have died in the line of duty.

The Philadelphia Police Department has a history of police brutality, intimidation, coercion, and disregard for constitutional rights, particularly during the tenure of Frank Rizzo as police commissioner (1967–1971) and mayor (1972–1980). The patterns of police brutality were documented in a 1978 Pulitzer Prize–winning Philadelphia Inquirer series by William K. Marimow and Jon Neuman.

== History ==
=== 19th century ===
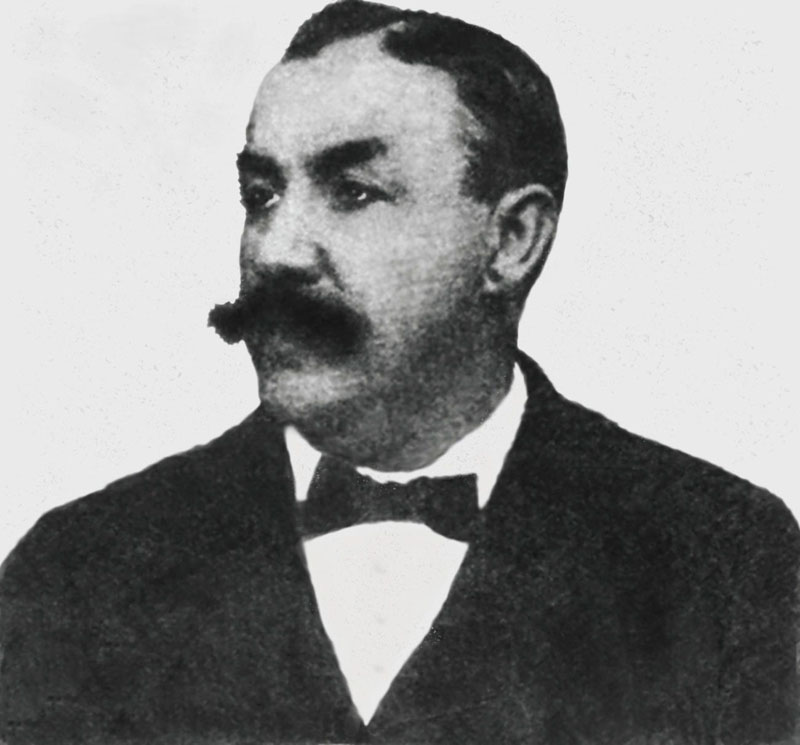
Philadelphia police detective Frank Geyer, who investigated H. H. Holmes, one of the nation's first serial killers

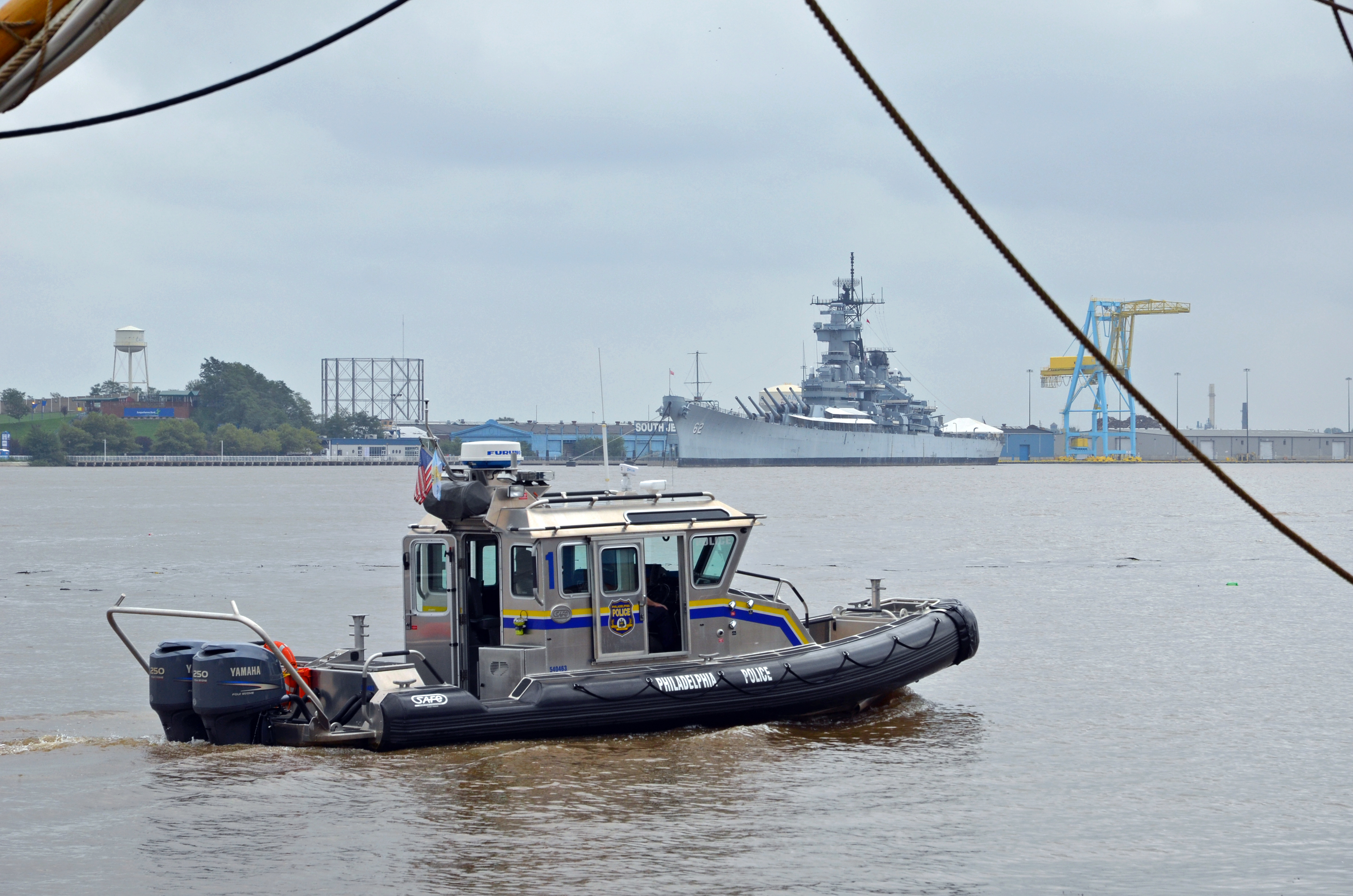
A Philadelphia Police Department boat on the Delaware River following the September 11 attacks

In 1797, Philadelphia established a night watch, and employed its first police officers to patrol the streets in daytime in 1833. The two entities were combined in 1854 to form the Philadelphia Police Department, which was modeled on London's Metropolitan Police.

In 1870, a Philadelphia policeman shot and killed Henry Truman, an unarmed Black man in an alley. He was found guilty of manslaughter.

In 1887, the police department was put under control of the city's Department of Public Safety. Two years later, the PPD inaugurated its mounted patrol, which was disbanded in 2004 but restored in 2011.

=== 20th century ===
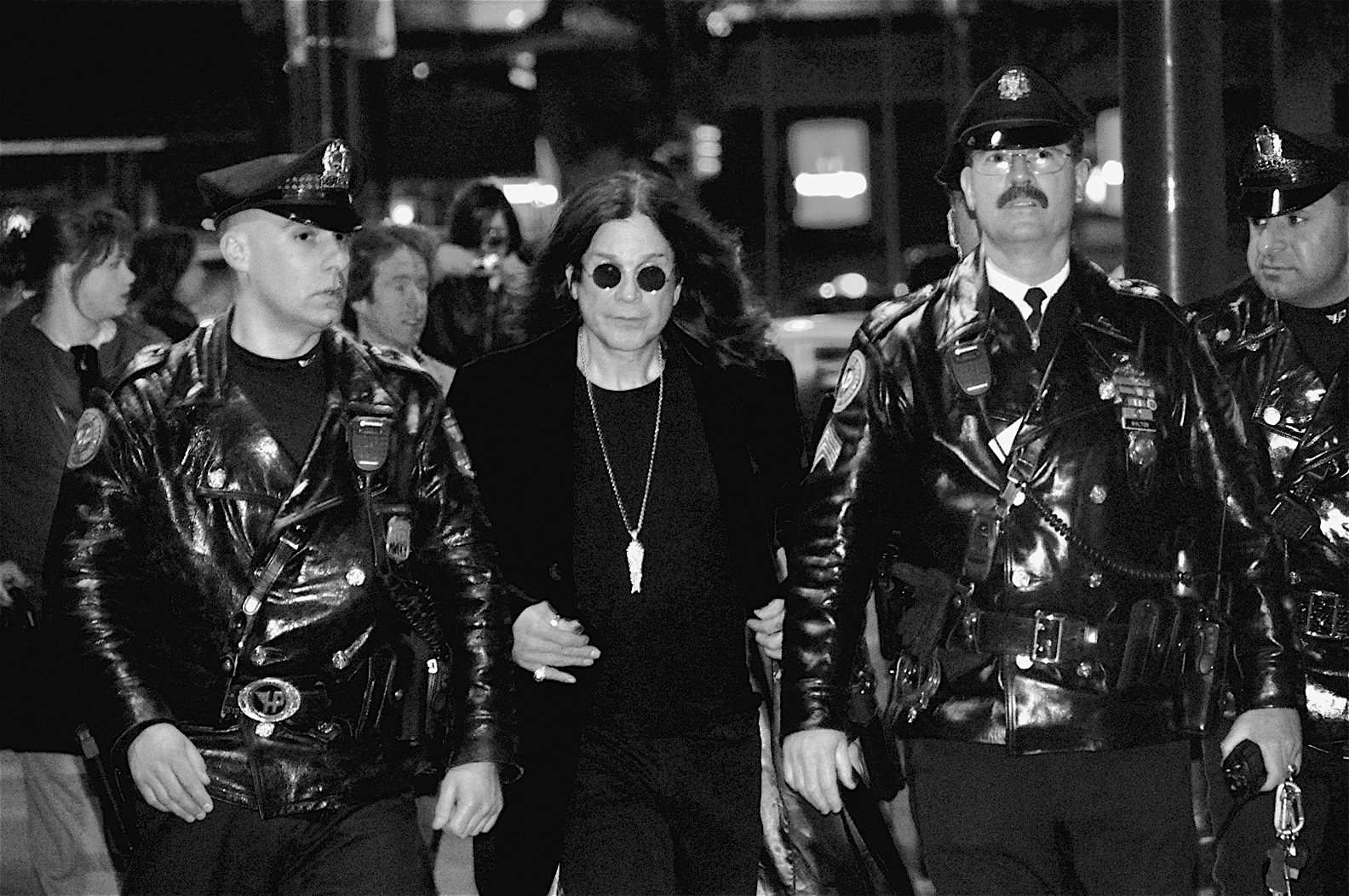
Philadelphia Police Department Highway Patrol Officers accompanying rock musician Ozzy Osbourne after a book signing in Center City in January 2010

In 1913, L. M. Gillespie became one of the first women police officers in Philadelphia. Major race riots broke out in 1919 and 1964.

A well publicized raid of the Black Panther Party occurred September 1, 1970. During the weekend of August 29–30, 1970, seven Philadelphia policemen were shot during widespread racial tension.

In 1974, the Pennsylvania Crime Commission's "Report on Police Corruption and the Quality of Law Enforcement in Philadelphia" concluded "that police corruption in Philadelphia is ongoing, widespread, systematic, and occurring at all levels of the police department. Corrupt practices were uncovered during the investigation in every police district and involved police officers ranging in rank from policeman to inspector. Specific acts of corruption involving improper cash payments to the police by gamblers, racketeers, bar owners, businessmen, nightclub owners, after-hours club owners, prostitutes, and others are detailed in the report. More than 400 individual police officers are identified by first name, last initial, and badge or payroll number as receiving improper payments in terms of cash, merchandise, sexual services, or meals."

A 1978 Pulitzer Prize-winning series in The Philadelphia Inquirer by William K. Marimow and Jon Neuman documented extensive patterns of police brutality in the PPD. The tenure of Frank Rizzo as police commissioner (1967–1971) and mayor (1972–1980) has frequently been characterized as a period in which the PPD engaged in extensive police brutality and discriminatory policing.

In 1985, federal judge Clarence Charles Newcomer criticized the PPD for indiscriminately arresting a number of Spanish-speaking people after an officer was killed, calling the arrests "unlawful" and "disgraceful".

In 1985, a residential eviction against an anarcho-primitivist organization called MOVE lead to a shootout between the group and the PPD. During the standoff, a PPD Lieutenant in a PA State Police helicopter dropped C-4 onto a bunker on the roof of the house, often referred to as the MOVE compound. This caused a fire that killed six adults and five children in the house, and burned 65 other houses to the ground. The incident was investigated by the Philadelphia Special Investigation Commission (MOVE).

=== 21st century ===
In 2000, carjacking/shooting suspect Thomas Jones was beaten while wounded by more than one dozen law enforcement officers.

In 2012, the PPD's education and/or experience requirements were increased to include at least one of four new options, including 60 college credits.

In 2017, the PPD announced it would be moving the headquarters to the old Inquirer Building.

In 2018, the Philadelphia Police Department's Gun Violence Reduction Task Force (G.V.R.T.F.) was founded within the Detective Bureau. The Task Force is staffed entirely by Detectives, and was created to focus on violent offenders & prior convicts (felons) in possession of firearms.

In 2019, 72 Philadelphia police officers were taken off street duty over racist and hateful Facebook posts.

In August of 2019, Six PPD officers were shot during a standoff with Maurice Hill after serving a drug warrant on his neighbor.

In 2019, Commissioner Ross resigned amid sexual harassment claims within the organization. In 2020, during the George Floyd protests in Philadelphia, Police Staff Inspector Joseph Bologna was suspended and charged with aggravated assault after he allegedly hit a student protester with a baton. Other incidents caught on video involving Bologna regarding the 2020 protests saw him tackling a female protester who had touched his bicycle, lunging at a journalist, and hitting a security guard. Previously in the 2000s, Bologna was videoed instructing his officers to turn off security cameras for a raid, and was suspended for "failing to properly supervise". A West Philadelphia unit he managed in the 2010s accumulated many misconduct complaints. Bologna was later found "Not Guilty" by a jury.

In 2021, the city of Philadelphia paid $2 million to a Black woman who in 2020 was pulled from a car and beaten by PPD officers, as well as separated from her toddler for hours. The Fraternal Order of Police posted pictures on social media claiming "This child was lost during the violent riots in Philadelphia, wandering around barefoot in an area that was experiencing complete lawlessness. The only thing this Philadelphia Police Officer cared about in that moment was protecting this child." The officers involved in the beating of the woman and her separation from the toddler have since been fired.

In 2021, a PPD Detective was reassigned and investigated after the department received evidence indicating she had attended the January 6 rally in support of overturning the 2020 presidential election result that preceded the U.S. Capitol attack. The investigation revealed the Detective did not participate in the riot, and did not enter the Capitol building.

A 2021 report found that of more than 9,000 civilian complaints against PPD officers, "only 0.5% of civilian allegations resulted in any recorded consequence beyond a reprimand." The study found that not a single allegation of civil rights violations (including racial profiling and racial slurs by officers) was upheld.

In 2023, Philadelphia police shot and killed Eddie Irizarry during a traffic stop; the initial narrative given by Philadelphia police was that Irizarry was outside his vehicle, told by officers to drop a weapon, and "lunged at the officers", prompting the shooting. A day later, Philadelphia police admitted that Irizarry was actually inside his car during the shooting. Body camera footage showed Irizarry being shot through his car's rolled-up driver-side window, around five seconds after the shooting officer alighted from a police car. The shooting officer has been charged with murder. In September 2023, the charges were dismissed by Municipal Judge Wendy Pew.

In late October 2023, Officer Patrick Heron accepted a plea deal that would place him in confinement for between fifteen and forty years. He had been accused of 200 counts related to charges of unlawful contact, sexual abuse of children, and forgery.

=== Notable investigations ===
- 1894-95, Detective Frank P. Geyer investigated H. H. Holmes, one of America's first serial killers who confessed to killing twenty-seven men, women, and children, some of which were later determined to be alive. Holmes killed his business partner, Benjamin Pitezel, in Philadelphia and later killed three of Pitezel's young children (two in Irvington, and one in Canada). Detective Geyer is credited with finding the bodies of the three children after a cross-country, international investigation.
- 1981, PPD Officer Daniel Faulkner was fatally shot by Mumia Abu-Jamal (né Wesley Cook) while performing a routine traffic stop of the latter's brother, William Cook. A jury convicted Abu-Jamal, a former Black Panther Party member, of first degree murder. He was sentenced to death in 1982, but in 2011 prosecutors said they would drop their pursuit of his execution and agreed to accept de facto life imprisonment without parole. The incident, subsequent trial and Abu-Jamal's conviction remain controversial in the US and around the world.
- 1999, serial killer Gary Heidnik was executed by lethal injection. Heidnik kidnapped, tortured and raped six women and kept them prisoner in his Philadelphia basement. A jury convicted Heidnik of the first degree murders of two of the women and sentenced him to death.
- 2001, American Ira Samuel Einhorn, a.k.a. "The Unicorn Killer" (born May 15, 1940), was extradited from France back to Philadelphia to stand trial for the 1977 murder of Holly Maddux. Einhorn was an outspoken activist in the 1960s and '70s. In 1981, Einhorn fled to Europe to avoid the trial. In 1993, Einhorn had a trial in absentia and was convicted of first degree murder. In 2002, he was retried and again convicted. Einhorn was sentenced to life in prison without parole.
- 2012, Antonio Rodriguez, a.k.a. "The Kensington Strangler", received three life sentences for murdering three women in 2010. PPD Homicide Detectives obtained a confession from Rodriguez after he was arrested.
- 2013, a federal jury convicted drug lord Kaboni Savage and his sister, Kidada, of orchestrating the 2004 firebomb murders of a witness's six family members and of conspiring to participate in a violent drug enterprise. The jury convicted Kaboni of 12 murders in total and he was later sentenced to death.

== Organization ==
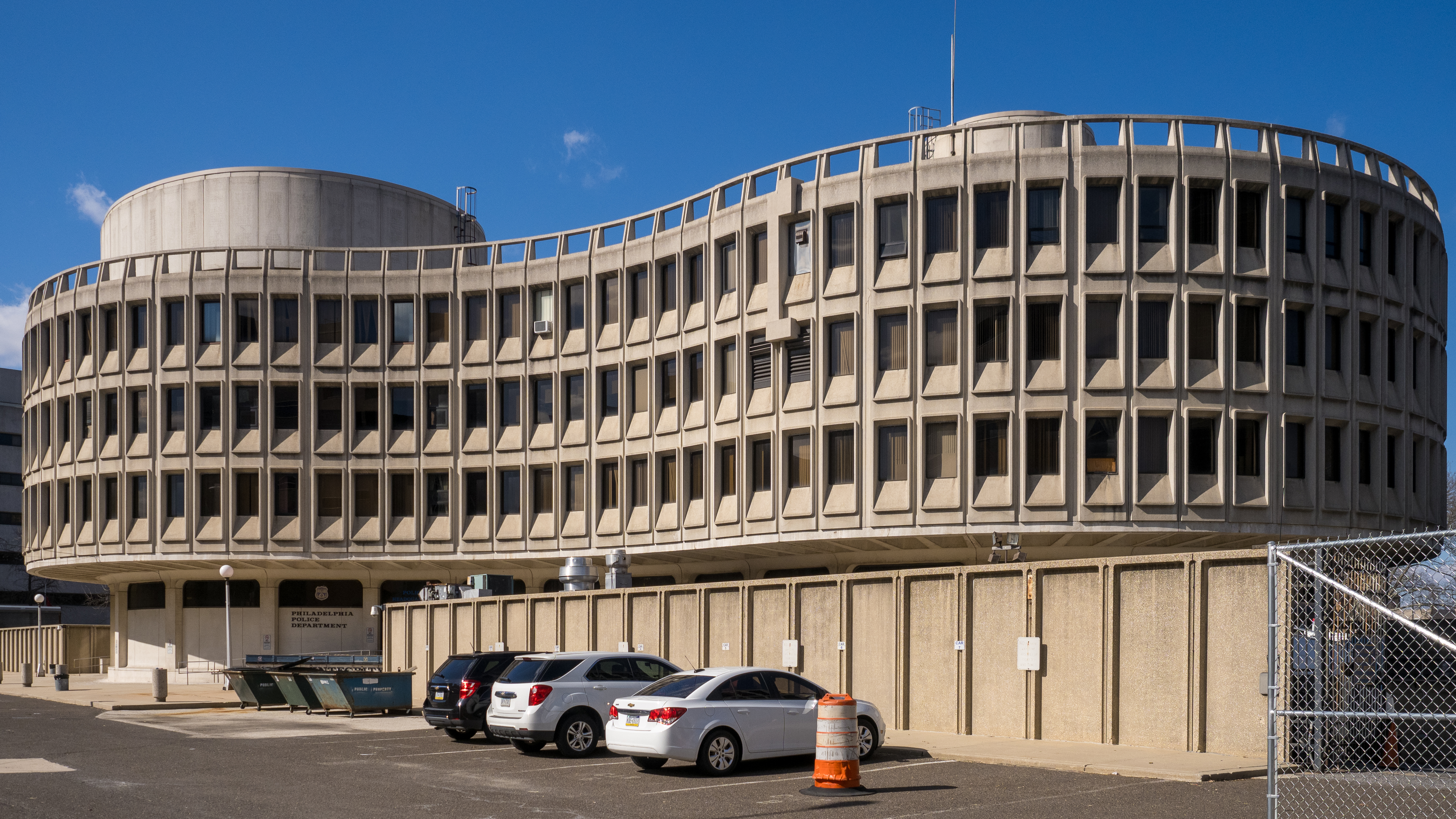
The former headquarters of the Philadelphia Police Department, known as "The Roundhouse", located at 750 Race Street, designed by Philadelphia architect Robert Geddes

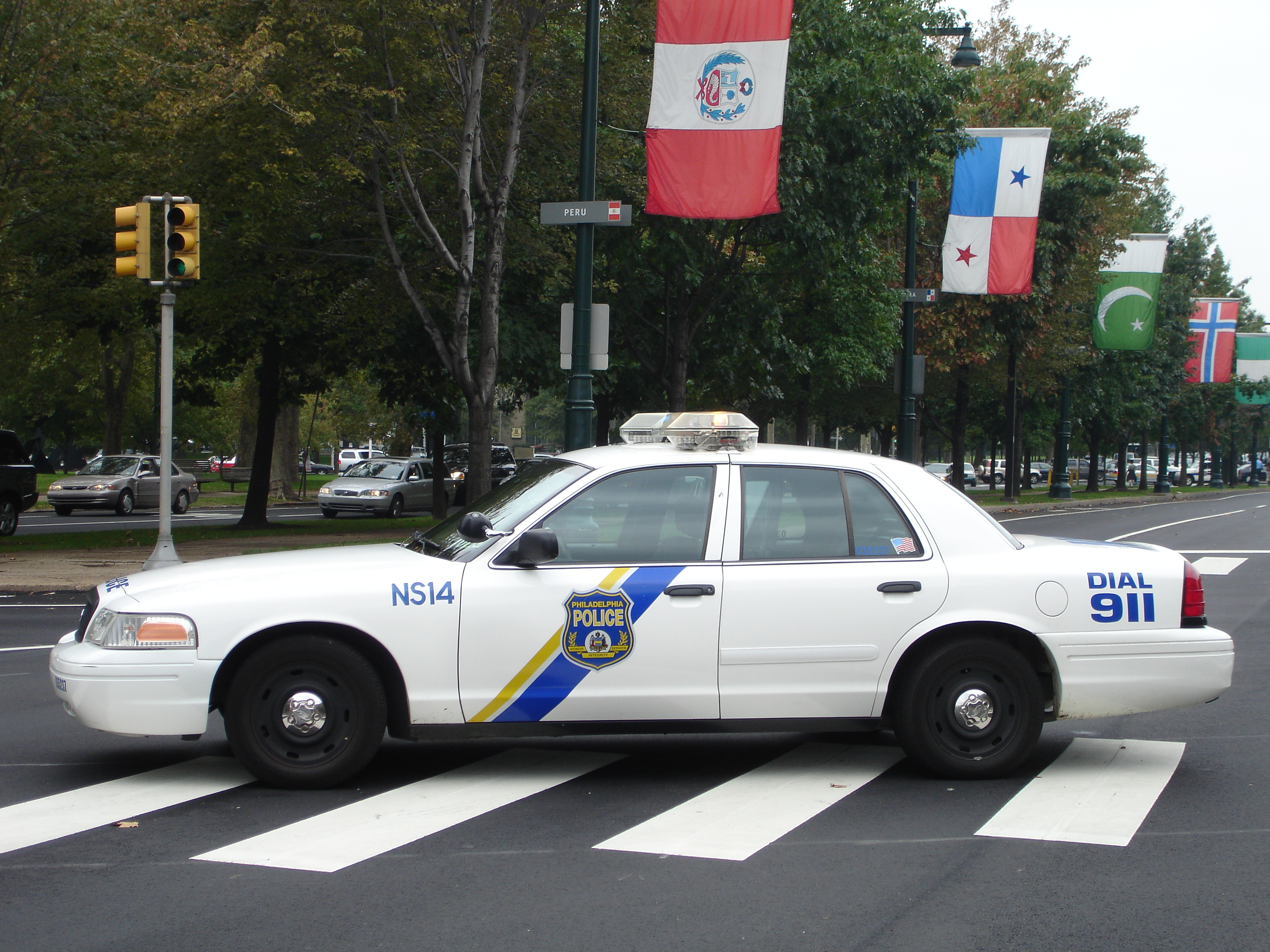
A Philadelphia Police Department police car on patrol in 2006

The PPD employs over 6,400 sworn officers and over 800 civilian personnel, and patrols an area of 369.4 km^{2} (142.6 mi^{2}) with a population of almost 1.5 million. The department is subdivided into 21 patrol districts, and like many other large municipal police forces, it incorporates many special units such as a K-9 Unit, SWAT, Bomb Squad, Community Relations Unit, Marine Unit, Narcotics Unit, and Highway Patrol Unit.

The head of the PPD is the Police Commissioner, who is appointed by the Mayor. The current Commissioner is Kevin Bethel.

Under the Commissioner are two three-star Deputy Commissioners. The First Deputy Commissioner heads Field Operations. The Deputy Commissioner and Chief Administrative Officer heads Organizational Services, Strategy, and Innovation.

The Office of Field Operations is headed by the three-star First Deputy Commissioner of Field Operations. The current First Deputy Commissioner is John Stanford. The force comprises two commands, Patrol Operations and, Specialized Operations and Homeland Security; each command is headed by a two-star Deputy Commissioner. The Investigations Command is headed by a two star Deputy Commissioner. The two star Deputy Commissioner of Investigations is in charge of the Detective Divisions and Special Investigation Units/Divisions. The Detective Bureau is divided into two elements, with one Chief Inspector overseeing Detective Divisions, and a second Chief Inspector overseeing Special Investigation Units.

The Office of Organizational Services, Strategy, and Innovation is headed by the three-star Deputy Commissioner and Chief Administrative Officer.

Patrol Operations is headed by a two-star Deputy Commissioner of Patrol Operations. Patrol Operations is divided into two regional commands, Regional Operations Command (North) and Regional Operations Command (South). Each regional command is headed by a Chief Inspector, and is subdivided into three divisions (ROC-North: East, Northwest, Northeast; ROC-South: Central, Southwest, South). Each patrol division is headed by an Inspector. A division comprises three or four districts; there are 21 patrol districts in all, and each district is headed by a captain. Each District is subdivided into three or four police service areas (PSA's), each headed by a Lieutenant, for a total of 64 PSA's citywide.

In January 2013, Commissioner Ramsey announced changes to the command structure of the department lowering the number of deputy commissioners from 9 to 6. Ramsey only replaced one of the deputies who was promoted from staff inspector of the Internal Affairs Bureau to deputy commissioner of the Office of Professional Responsibility.

=== Mounted units ===
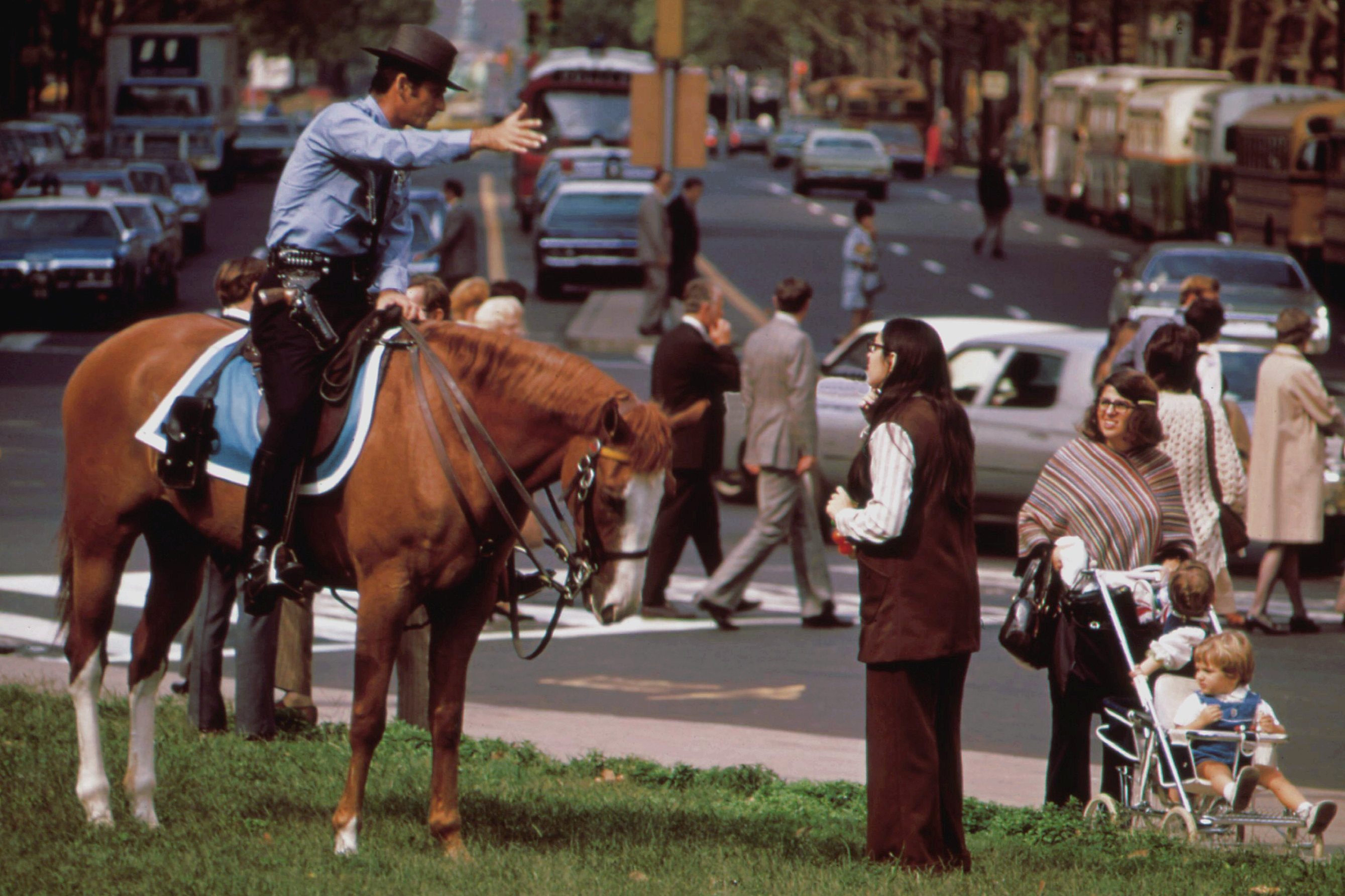
A Philadelphia police officer in the Mounted Patrol Unit in October 1973

The beginnings of the mounted unit can be traced to the Fairmount Park Mounted Guard created in 1867. In 1889 the Philadelphia Police Mounted Patrol Unit was established. The Philadelphia Police unit survived until 1952, however, the Fairmount Park unit would be used for parades and crowd control measures. The Fairmount Park Mounted Guard became the Fairmount Park Police in 1966, but maintained the same responsibilities. In 1972, Mayor Frank Rizzo found it unnecessary for taxpayers to fund two separate police departments, and merged the Fairmount Park Police into the Philadelphia Police, creating the Park Division. The mounted unit was once again used to patrol the streets of Philadelphia. The mounted unit survived to celebrate 100 years in 1989, but was disbanded in 2004 due to budgetary cuts by Mayor John F. Street's administration.

On July 18, 2008, Philadelphia Police Commissioner Charles H. Ramsey confirmed that plans are in the works to recreate the mounted unit.

The Philadelphia Inquirer again reported on June 2, 2009, that Ramsey hoped to revive the unit once the city was in a better financial standing.

The continued recreation of the Mounted Unit took an additional step forward on October 31, 2011, when the city announced plans to build a new facility for the unit in Fairmount Park.

== Ranks within the Philadelphia Police Department ==
Title	Insignia	Uniform shirt color	Type of rank	Reference
Police Commissioner		White	Command rank. The Police Commissioner is appointed by the city's managing director with the approval of the mayor	
First Deputy Police Commissioner		White	Command rank. The First Deputy Police Commissioner is appointed by the city's managing director with the approval of the mayor	
Deputy Police Commissioner		White	Command rank. The Deputy Police Commissioner is appointed by the city's managing director with the approval of the mayor	
Chief Inspector		White	Command rank. Civil service rank	
Inspector		White	Command rank. Civil service rank	
Staff Inspector		White	Command rank. Civil service rank	
Captain		White	Command rank. Civil service rank	
Lieutenant		White	Managerial rank. Civil service rank	
Sergeant		White	Supervisory rank. Civil service rank	
Corporal		White	Supervisory rank. Civil service rank	
Detective	Gold badge	None	Investigator rank. Civil service rank.	
Police Officer	No insignia	Navy Blue	Operational rank. Civil service rank	
Police Officer Recruit	No insignia	Navy Blue		

=== Rank descriptions ===
To be promoted in the Philadelphia Police Department, police officers must finish their first year in the department. Then, when the next Corporal or Detective test is announced, they are eligible to take the test. Philadelphia PD Test for Corporal and Detectives is a written multiple choice test, lasting two to three hours. Also part of an officer's score is based on seniority.

The ranks of Corporal and Detective have the same pay grade, but have different functions. The rank of Corporal is the first supervisory rank. Corporals are "Operations Room supervisors" and are responsible for overseeing a patrol district's operations room, or a special unit's operations; i.e., ensure that reports are submitted accurately and in a timely manner, etc. Only rarely do Corporals work the street. (A notable exception is Corporals in the SWAT Unit and Narcotics Bureau. Corporals in these assignments frequently work on the street.) A Corporal must have a minimum of a year's experience as a police officer.

Sergeants command a squad of officers, making assignments to beats, assigning traffic details, helping to supervise the radio room, commanding Marine Unit patrol boats and performing other similar tasks. When assigned to the Detective Bureau, a Sergeant interviews suspects and witnesses, assigns Detectives to cases and investigates clues, among other duties. Sergeants must have a minimum of two years experience as a Police Officer, or a year's experience as a Corporal or Detective.

The rank of Lieutenant is a managerial rank. Lieutenants command an assigned area in a police district or a specialized unit, such as a traffic unit. If assigned to the Detective Bureau, a Lieutenant supervises an investigation. Lieutenants must have a minimum of one year's experience as a sergeant.

The rank of Captain is the first command rank. Captains either command police districts or direct the activities of a specialized unit. When assigned as a detective, a Captain organizes and directs surveillance activities and police raids, prepares cases, interviews and interrogates suspects and testifies in court. Captains must have a minimum of one year's experience as a Lieutenant.

Staff inspectors are usually departmental administrative officers, serving on the police Command Staff under a commissioner or deputy commissioner. They are generally assigned to inspect police divisions, districts and units, evaluate police practices, equipment and personnel, and make recommendations for improvement where necessary; however, they may also command units and divisions. Staff Inspectors must have a minimum of one year's service as a captain.

Inspectors are senior executive officers who typically command divisions and supervise officers under their command during any major police action, disaster or emergency. Inspectors must have a minimum of one year's service as a Staff Inspector or Captain.

Chief Inspectors are senior departmental administrative officers who either command bureaus within the department or are in charge of a regional command.They also inspect police divisions, districts and units, evaluate police practices, equipment and personnel, and make recommendations for improvement where necessary. Chief Inspectors must have a minimum of one year's service as a Staff Inspector.

Deputy Commissioners and above are appointed by the city managing director with mayoral approval, not by the city civil service. The two First Deputy Commissioners head the Office of Field Operations and the Office of Organizational Accountability. The commissioner is appointed by the city managing director with mayoral approval, and is in charge of the entire department.

=== Detectives ===
Detectives are part of the Detective Bureau, and may be assigned to Detective Divisions, or specialized units like Homicide, Shooting Investigation Group, Organized Crime/Intelligence, Special Victims Unit, Gun Permits Unit and Background Investigation. The commanding officer of a detective division (a Captain) reports to the Inspector of Detective Bureau Headquarters. The ranking supervisor at Detective Bureau Headquarters is the Chief Inspector of the Detective Bureau. Detectives are not considered supervisory personnel, despite being equivalent to a Corporal in pay grade. Detectives are a civil service rank of their own, and take orders from a Sergeant. There are also Police Officers who serve in an investigative capacity, such as in the Juvenile Aid and Special Victims Units. Police Officers who are assigned to the Detective Bureau are paid the same pay as a Police Officer assigned to patrol.

Unlike most law enforcement agencies, the Philadelphia Police Department Detective Bureau does not maintain the ranks such as Detective Sergeant or Detective Lieutenant, etc. The supervisors (Sergeant, Lieutenant & Captain) in the Detective Bureau can be transferred back to patrol, and are required to maintain a uniform.

Unlike other big city police departments, such as NYPD, Chicago Police Department, and LAPD, Philadelphia Police detectives do not have a uniform that can be worn during details or funerals. The prescribed attire of a Philadelphia Police Detective is proper business attire, and the rank of Detective is a permanent, plainclothes, civil service assignment. In the Philadelphia Police Department, the rank of Detective can only be achieved by a civil service exam and there are no grade differentiations. This is in contrast to NYPD that has the ability to make field promotions to the rank of Detective for an outstanding performance or circumstance.

== Demographics ==
The PPD's officers are and have been of many ethnicities. A large number of Irish Americans have been PPD officers since the 1850s.

- Male: 70%
- Female: 30%
- White: 57%
- African-American/Black: 33%
- Hispanic: 8%
- Other: 1.5%

== Awards and honors ==
=== Decorations ===
See: United States law enforcement decorations#Philadelphia Police Department

- Sgt. Robert F. Wilson III Commendation for Valor
- Commendation for Bravery
- Commendation for Heroism
- Commendation for Merit
- Commendatory Citation
- RNC Service Ribbon
- Military Service Ribbon
- Covid Ribbon

=== George Fencl Award ===
The George Fencl Award, named in honor of Philadelphia Police Chief Inspector George Fencl, is given by the Daily News to a Philadelphia Police Officer who exemplifies compassion, fairness, and civic commitment. The award was first given in 1986.

Year	Rank	Name	District/Division
1986	Captain	David Morrell	26th District, Commanding Officer
1987	Officer	Wiley L. Redding	35th District, Community Relations
1988	Officer	Joe Donato	19th District
1989	Captain	Al Lewis	22nd District, Commanding Officer
1990	Lieutenant	Jose Manuel Melendez	East Division, Community Interaction Task Force
1991	Captain	George Fenzil	Traffic Unit, Commanding Officer
1992	Lieutenant	Stephen Johnson	Police Conflict-Prevention and Resolution Unit, Commanding Officer
1993	Officer	Edwin "Bo" Diaz	26th District, Community Relations
1994	Captain	Arthur Durrant	26th District, Commanding Officer
1995	Officer	James Perkins	2nd District
1996	Officer	Joseph Dembeck	14th District
1997	Officer	Brenda Robinson-Stowe	16th District, Mounted Officer
1998	Captain	William Colarulo	25th District, Commanding Officer
1999	Officer	Bernard Turner	22nd District
2000	Chief Inspector	Dexter Green	Special Operations Unit, Commanding Officer
2001	Deputy Commissioner	Sylvester Johnson	Patrol, Narcotics, Detectives, and Special Operations, Commanding Officer
2002	Captain	William Fisher	Civil Affairs Unit, Commanding Officer
2003	Officer	Ruth McNatte	16th District, Community Relations
2004	Chief Inspector	James Tiano	Community Affairs Bureau, Commanding Officer
2005	Officer	Darlene Chapman-Cummings	Anti-Drug Program: DARE
2006	Officer	AnnaMae Law	26th District
2007	Chief of Staff	Kimberly Byrd	Chief of Staff
2008	Captain	Kevin Bethel	17th District, Commanding Officer
2009	Officer	Adrian Hospedale	12th District
2010	Officer	Richard "Butch" Riddick	12th District
2011	Officer	Joseph Young	12th District, Community Relations

== Officers who died on duty ==
Over 260 Philadelphia Police Department officers have died on duty. In 1996, Lauretha Vaird became the first female PPD officer to be killed in the line of duty from gunfire.

== See also ==
- 39th District corruption scandal
- Justice Juanita Kidd Stout Center for Criminal Justice
- List of law enforcement agencies in Pennsylvania
- Philadelphia Fire Department
