= Hanrahan =

Irish surname

Hanrahan, O'Hanrahan
- Language: Old Irish (Gaeilge)

Origin
- Meaning: derived from ánradh, meaning "warrior"
- Region of origin: Ireland

Other names
- Variant forms: Hanrahan; Handrahan, Hanraghan, Henrehan; Hanradhan

Hanrahan is an Irish surname shared by many Irish people and descendants of Irish emigrants. The name is most common in the area of the Shannon Estuary (counties Kerry, Limerick and Clare) in Ireland. Through emigration the name has become fairly common in the US, the UK and other countries to which the Irish emigrated. Many famous people share this name as well. The name was originally spelled "hAnnracháin" and initially used in the Irish province of Leinster, where local nobles and kings with the name ruled. Variations include Hanradhan and Hanraghan. Many families within Ireland and those of emigrants from Ireland, of the Ó hAnnracháin family, Anglicised their names to "O'Hanrahan" or "Hanrahan". Eochaidh, King of Leinster, an early monarch who fled to Scotland in exile in 540, was the first ruler to bear the surname. The name originates from Anradhán, diminutive of the Old Irish word "ánradh", which translates as "warrior".

According to historian C. Thomas Cairney, the O'Hanrahans were one of the chiefly families of the Dal gCais or Dalcassians who were a tribe of the Erainn who were the second wave of Celts to settle in Ireland between about 500 and 100 BC.

== Famous people with the name ==
=== Hanrahan ===
==== People ====
- Barbara Hanrahan, Australian artist and writer
- Barry Hanrahan, American Assistant General Manager, Philadelphia Flyers NHL Hockey Team
- Bill Hanrahan, American announcer for NBC Nightly News, d. 1996
- Brian Hanrahan, British-born BBC News correspondent, d. 2010
- Edmond M. Hanrahan, American former Securities and Exchange Commission chairman
- Edward Hanrahan, Illinois State Attorney
- Emerald O'Hanrahan British actress starred in the hit radio show The Archers
- Gareth Hanrahan, author and role-playing game designer
- Hugh Hanrahan, Canadian House of Commons member, d. 1999
- Jack Hanrahan, American comedic writer, d. 2008
- Jake Hanrahan, British-born conflict journalist and documentary filmmaker.
- James Hanrahan, American founder of St. Thomas More school and coach
- JJ Hanrahan, Irish professional rugby player
- Joe Hanrahan, Irish footballer
- Joel Hanrahan, American baseball player with the Boston Red Sox
- John Hanrahan, American politician
- Kevin Hanrahan, American mobster, d. 1992
- Kieran Hanrahan, Irish musician and radio host
- Kip Hanrahan, Irish-American jazz musician
- Liam Hanrahan, English professional boxer
- Maura Hanrahan, Canadian author
- Michael Hanrahan, American politician
- Michael O'Hanrahan, Irish rebel leader executed by firing squad by the British during the 1916 Rising
- Mike Hanrahan, Irish songwriter and former lead singer of Stockton's Wing
- Milo Yiannopoulos (born Milo Hanrahan), British journalist
- Noelle Hanrahan, American director for Prison Radio, noted for recording Mumia Abu-Jamal's
- Will Hanrahan, British TV Producer and Presenter
- Pegeen Hanrahan, American mayor of Gainesville, Florida
- Pat Hanrahan, American professor at Stanford University
- Packy Hanrahan, American professional tenpin bowler
- Peter Hanrahan, Irish footballer
- Robb Hanrahan, former news anchor
- Robert P. Hanrahan, former U. S. representative
- Will Hanrahan, British-born television personality

==== In fiction ====
- Owen Red Hanrahan, fictional character who appears in several works by William Butler Yeats
- Peter "Red" Hanrahan, character in Dragonriders of Pern
- Peter O'Hanraha-hanrahan, news economic correspondent in The Day Today
- Sorka Hanrahan, character in Dragonriders of Pern
- Timothy P. Hanrahan, the real name of the fictional character Blowtorch from the G.I. Joe franchise
- Tommy Hanrahan, a hockey goalie in Slap Shot

=== hAnnracháin ===
- Neasa Ní hAnnrachain, Irish actress
- Tadhg Ó hAnnracháin, Irish author

== Hanrahan in other media ==
=== Poetry ===
- Said Hanrahan – a poem by Australian poet John O'Brien

== See also ==
- Handrahan
- Irish clans
