= Debo Adegbile =

American lawyer (born 1966)

- Born: December 1966 (age 59); The Bronx, New York, United States
- Education: Connecticut College (BA); New York University (JD)
- Occupation: Lawyer

Debo Patrick Adegbile (born December 1966) is an American lawyer in private practice and a former Commissioner for the United States Civil Rights Commission. He was previously nominated to serve as the United States Assistant Attorney General for the United States Department of Justice Civil Rights Division. The Senate ultimately failed to confirm his nomination. The Fraternal Order of Police objected vehemently to a brief he filed arguing that there was racial discrimination in jury selection for the trial of Mumia Abu-Jamal, who was convicted of the murder of a law enforcement officer.

Adegbile also worked for the NAACP Legal Defense and Educational Fund and as a senior counsel on the staff of the United States Senate Committee on the Judiciary.

On December 15, 2016, the White House appointed Adegbile to the United States Commission on Civil Rights. This position does not require senate confirmation.

== Early life and education ==
Born Adebowale Patrick Akande Adegbile in New York City, Adegbile is the son of a Nigerian father and an Irish immigrant mother. He was raised by his single mother. He also was a child actor on the children's TV show Sesame Street during the 1970s, playing the character Debo and performing in episodes for nine years.

Adegbile studied at Lehman College in 1986 and 1987 and earned a bachelor's degree in 1991 from Connecticut College. He then earned a J.D. degree from New York University School of Law in 1994.

== Professional career ==
During law school, Adegbile served as a legal assistant in the summer of 1991 for the New York law firm Solin & Breindel and then was a summer associate during the summer of 1992 for Morrison & Foerster. In the summer of 1993, Adegbile served as a summer associate for Paul, Weiss, Rifkind, Wharton & Garrison. He then joined the firm full-time as an associate in the firm's litigation department in 1994, holding that position until 2001.

In 2001, Adegbile joined the NAACP Legal Defense and Educational Fund, where he served as assistant counsel from 2001 until 2004, associate director of litigation from 2004 until 2007, director of litigation from 2007 until 2010, associate director-counsel/director of litigation from 2010 until 2014, acting president and director counsel from 2012 until 2013, and special counsel in 2013. Adegbile argued his first case before the United States Supreme Court in 2008, making a defense of the Voting Rights Act.

== Consideration for the D.C. Circuit ==
In October 2011, blogger Ed Whelan reported that the White House was considering nominating Adegbile to one of three vacancies at the time on the United States Court of Appeals for the District of Columbia Circuit. Shortly thereafter, The Washington Post reported that President Obama had asked the American Bar Association to evaluate Adegbile's credentials, but the White House did not submit his name.

== Nomination to be Assistant Attorney General ==
In 2013, Adegbile joined the staff of the United States Senate Committee on the Judiciary as a senior counsel with a focus on legislative matters.

On November 18, 2013, President Obama nominated Adegbile to serve as Assistant Attorney General for the Civil Rights Division, to succeed Thomas Perez, who had left the position to serve as United States Secretary of Labor.

U.S Senators from both parties objected to Adegbile's signing of an appeal for Black Panther member Mumia Abu-Jamal who was convicted in 1982 for the first-degree murder of Daniel Faulkner, a Philadelphia police officer, on December 9, 1981. Mumia Abu-Jamal was sentenced to death, although the death sentence later was vacated because of problems with jury instructions. Adegbile and other lawyers filed an unsuccessful amicus curiae brief with the United States Supreme Court in 2009, arguing that the conviction was invalid because of racial discrimination in jury selection.

In January 2014, Adegbile's nomination was returned to Obama, who renominated Adegbile within days.

On February 6, 2014, the United States Senate Committee on the Judiciary reported Adegbile's nomination to the full Senate in a 10–8, party-line vote. On February 27, 2014, Senate Majority Leader Harry Reid filed for cloture on Adegbile's nomination, in an effort to cut off a filibuster by Republican senators.

On March 5, 2014, the U.S. Senate failed to advance Adegbile's nomination in a 47–52 vote blocking his confirmation. Senate Republicans unanimously voted against him, particularly because of his appeal for Abu-Jamal, along with seven Democratic Senators, including Abu-Jamal's home state senator, Bob Casey of Pennsylvania.

On September 15, 2014, Adegbile announced his withdrawal as a nominee to be assistant attorney general, and that he would be going into private practice, joining the law firm of Wilmer Cutler Pickering Hale and Dorr.

== Appointment to be a Commissioner on the United States Commission on Civil Rights ==
On December 15, 2016, President Barack Obama announced his appointment of Debo P. Adegbile to the United States Commission on Civil Rights.

== Personal life ==
Adegbile's first name "Adebowale" means "crown comes home" in Yoruba. He is married to Susan Haskell-Adegbile, and they live in New York City with their two daughters, Sela and Devan.
