= Unbound Allstars =

American hip hop group

Unbound Allstars were a one-off collaboration of various hip-hop artists who recorded the track "Mumia 911", supporting the release of death row inmate, Mumia Abu-Jamal. The artists involved included Public Enemy's Chuck D., Rage Against the Machine front man Zack de la Rocha, Dead Prez and Pharoahe Monch.

== Mumia 911 ==
The LP, Mumia 911, was released in 1999 by Ground Control and included all 10 versions of the song.

=== Track list ===
1. "Rocks tha World" (full length mix)
2. "Rocks tha World" (full length mix censored)
3. "Rocks tha World" (full length mix instrumental)
4. "Accapella"
5. "Fatlip" (West Coast mix)
6. "Fatlip" (West Coast mix censored)
7. "Fatlip" (West Coast mix instrumental)
8. "Diamond D" (East Coast mix)
9. "Diamond D" (East Coast mix censored)
10. "Adampa 33" (remix)

You can find this song on The Unbound Project Vol.1

== Artists involved ==
- Afu Ra (Tracks 1, 2, 4 & 10)
- Goldii Loks (Tracks 1, 2, 4 & 10)
- Pharoahe Monch (Tracks 1, 2, 4, 8, 9 & 10)
- Aceyalone (Tracks 1, 2, 4, 5, 6 & 10)
- Wise Intelligent (Tracks 1, 2, 4 & 10)
- Slimkid Tre (Tracks 1, 2, 4, 5, 6 & 10)
- Sayeed (Tracks 1, 2, 4 & 10)
- Zack de la Rocha (of Rage Against the Machine) (Tracks 1, 2, 4, 5, 6 & 10)
- Jean Grae (a.k.a. What? What?) (Tracks 1, 2, 4, 5, 6 & 10)
- Tragedy (Tracks 1, 2, 4, 8, 9 & 10)
- Channel Live (Tracks 1, 2, 4 & 10)
- Dead Prez (Tracks 1, 2, 4, 8, 9 & 10)
- Chuck D. (of Public Enemy) (Tracks 1, 2, 4, 8, 9 & 10)
- Divine Styler (Tracks 1, 2, 4, 5, 6 & 10)
- The Last Emperor (Tracks 1, 2, 4, 8, 9 & 10)
- Black Thought (Tracks 1, 2, 4, 8, 9 & 10)
- P.E.A.C.E. (Tracks 1, 2, 4, 5, 6 & 10)

== See also ==
- Mumia Abu-Jamal
