= We Want Freedom =

2004 memoir by Mumia Abu-Jamal

- Author: Mumia Abu-Jamal
- Language: English
- Genre: Memoir
- Publisher: South End Press
- Publication date: 2004
- Pages: 292 pp.
- ISBN: 978-0-89608-719-4
- OCLC: 53919937v

We Want Freedom: A Life in the Black Panther Party is a memoir written by Mumia Abu-Jamal and published in 2004 by South End Press. Written while on death row and adapted from his master thesis, it tells the story of the Black Panther Party branch of Philadelphia through Abu-Jamal's perspective, including discussion on the FBI's Counter Intelligence Program impact on the group and its eventual dissolution.

== Style ==
Published as a memoir, Abu-Jamal's book was noted by critics and historians to instead be focused on discussing and analysing the Black Panther Party (BPP)'s history and its impact on the author's contemporaries. Historian Robyn C. Spencer said in her analysis of We Want Freedom that it "does not unfold like a traditional autobiography" and could be classified as a "resistance narrative", a term used by literary scholar Margo V. Perkins to mean "a work where 'activists seek to document their experiences, to correct misinformation, to educate their readers, and to encourage the continuation of struggle.'"

The book contains interviews with and works by members of the BPP, and declassified FBI documents from the Counter Intelligence Program, all of which are used to tell the movement's story while Abu-Jamal intersperses those with first person accounts, marked by the use of italics. According to Spencer, Abu-Jamal "writes as journalist, political commentator, organic intellectual, former Panther [and] current death row inmate."

== Reception ==
A review published in the Reference and Research Book News commented on the lack of information about Abu-Jamal's own history as a member of Philadelphia's BPP and how it instead focus on the group itself. Publishers Weekly called We Want Freedom a "polemic-cum-history" and discussed the author's attempt "to place the Panthers within the noble tradition of African-American armed resistance".

J. H. Smith, writing for Choice, praised the book "for its comprehensiveness, and the deftness by which it explains the appropriateness of human radicalism." Smith goes on to highlight Abu-Jamal's experience as a writer and how his time on death row "made him more insightful than bitter", and concludes the review by saying that "[c]overage of FBI actions and the role of Panther women, along with empathetic characterizations of Panther leaders, make the book worth the purchase."

Spencer, who published an analysis of the book, calls We Want Freedom "a richly textured narrative that defies easy characterization." Spencer goes on to praise the fact the book contains analysis of the BPP "from a rank-and-file perspective", differing from most other works. She concludes by saying that the book "despite its flaws, will have an important place in the literature of the Black Panther Party."
