= Albert F. Sabo =

American lawyer

Albert F. Sabo (December 21, 1920 – May 8, 2002) was an American lawyer and judge of the Philadelphia County Court of Common Pleas. He is known for presiding over the 1982 murder trial of Mumia Abu-Jamal. Sabo served as a judge from 1974 until his retirement in 1998.

Born in Philadelphia in a family with Slovak origins, Sabo grew up in the Northern Liberties neighborhood and graduated from Roman Catholic High School in 1938. He earned two degrees from the University of Pennsylvania: a bachelor's degree in economics from the Wharton School in 1942 and a law degree from the University of Pennsylvania Law School in 1948. Sabo was a World War II veteran and part of the United States Army Air Forces.

Sabo served as county undersheriff for 16 years before being elected to the bench. For 15 years while on the bench, Sabo exclusively heard homicide cases. Sabo presided over 31 cases that resulted in the imposition of the death penalty, which was reported in 1992 by The Philadelphia Inquirer to be the most in the state. In 1995, in the time before Abu-Jamal was scheduled to be executed, Sabo had 24-hour security due to angry, offensive faxes and calls directed to him. On September 15, 1995, Sabo denied Abu-Jamal a retrial.

In 2000, the stenographer at the Abu-Jamal trial, Terri Maurer-Carter, signed an affidavit stating that during the trial she overheard the judge saying of the defendant, "Yeah and I'm gonna help 'em fry the nigger."

Sabo died in 2002 of heart failure. At the time of his death, he was living in the Mount Airy neighborhood of Philadelphia.
