= In Prison My Whole Life =

- Directed by: Marc Evans
- Written by: Marc Evans; William Francome
- Produced by: Livia Giuggioli; Nick Goodwin Self
- Starring: Mumia Abu-Jamal; Robert R. Bryan; Boots Riley; Noam Chomsky; Mos Def; Snoop Dogg; Steve Earle; William Francome; Russell Simmons; Alice Walker; Howard Zinn
- Cinematography: Ari Issler
- Edited by: Mags Arnold
- Production companies: Fandango; Nana
- Release dates: May 2007 (Cannes Film Festival); 23 October 2008 (United Kingdom); 23 November 2011 (France)
- Running time: 99 minutes
- Country: United Kingdom
- Language: English
- Budget: $2,400

In Prison My Whole Life is a 2007 documentary film about American journalist and prisoner Mumia Abu-Jamal, directed by Marc Evans, and written by Evans and William Francome. Others involved with the project were Robert R. Bryan, Angela Davis, Anthony Arnove, Dead Prez, Howard Zinn, Mos Def, Noam Chomsky, Robert Meeropol, Russell Simmons, Snoop Dogg and Steve Earle. The film's executive producer is Colin Firth.

The film explores the life of imprisoned journalist and political activist Mumia Abu-Jamal, and his years on death row. The title refers to Abu-Jamal having been arrested and jailed in December 1981, on the day William Francome was born. He has been in prison ever since his conviction in 1982. His death sentence for killing a police officer was overturned in 2001 due to constitutional problems with the penalty phase of his original 1982 sentencing hearing. The film investigates United States civil rights history and its justice system through Jamal's court case.

The film is available on DVD and VOD.

== Awards ==
The film was nominated in 2008 for 'World Cinema - Documentary' with the award of 'Grand Jury Prize' at the Sundance Film Festival.

The film premiered in France in October 2008 and was subsequently released by the festival in more than 20 towns. At the 2009 International Festival of Cinema on Human Rights in Paris, In Prison My Whole Life won the Student Award and the Planet Award. The film was released nationwide in France on 23 November 2011.

== Reception ==
The film has a 38% "Rotten" rating on Rotten Tomatoes. In a 2/5 star review, Time Out critic Tom Huddleston said of the film, "Sadly, My Little Eye director Marc Evans’s doc is only tangentially about Jamal – instead, he chooses to focus on William Francome. [...] Francome is an uninteresting central figure, unconnected to the case or the history of civil rights, to which the pair present a sort of Idiot’s Guide midway through. But Evans keeps him front and centre throughout [...] making ‘In Prison My Whole Life’ just another self-absorbed agit-prop documentary."

Jay Weissberg of Variety called it an "unfocused, oddly naive" film, and said that the editing "is overly dependent on computer tricks, and use of verbal loops to reinforce lines treats the audience like idiots."

By contrast, Le Monde said the film was "exciting", the editing being a "deliberated melting-pot", resulting in an overall "captivating portrait of Mumia Abu-Jamal".

== See also ==
- Mumia Abu-Jamal: A Case For Reasonable Doubt?
- Interviews Before Execution
