= Handrahan =

Handrahan is a surname of Irish origin. Notable people with the surname include:

- Alf Handrahan (born 1949), Canadian ice hockey player in World Hockey Association
- Vern Handrahan (1936–2016), Canadian pitcher in Major League Baseball

== See also ==
- Hanrahan
