= Maura Hanrahan =

Canadian author and academic (born 1963)

Maura Hanrahan (born 1963) is a Canadian author.

Hanrahan is retired (https://www.ulethbridge.ca/artsci/geography/meet-our-faculty-staff-0) Board of Governors Research Chair and associate professor at University of Lethbridge and an adjunct professor with Memorial University's Environmental Policy Institute. She is an acclaimed scholar and author of eleven books in several genres, including the Canadian best-seller Tsunami, which tells the story of a 1929 natural catastrophe caused by tsunami in Newfoundland. The book received the Heritage and History Award and was short-listed for the 2005 Newfoundland and Labrador Book Award for Non-fiction. Domino: The Eskimo Coast Disaster, a work of creative non-fiction, tells the story of a devastating hurricane in Labrador in 1885.

Hanrahan has won a number of awards for writing, including The Independent newspaper's inaugural student travel writing competition, the Lawrence Jackson Award for Writing (administered by the Newfoundland and Labrador Arts Council), and an Independent Press Award for her novel, Sheilagh’s Brush. She is the 2015 recipient of the Canadian Coast Guard Polaris Award in recognition for her work in preserving the maritime culture of Newfoundland and Labrador.

She is married to the novelist Paul Butler.

== Bibliography ==
- Through a Mirror Dimly: Essays on Newfoundland Society and Culture
- Uncertain Refuge: Lectures on Newfoundland Society and Culture (1993), ISBN 1-55081-087-1
- A Veritable Scoff: Sources on Foodways and Nutrition in Newfoundland and Labrador (2001) (with Marg Ewtushik)
- A Faith that Challenges: The Life of Jim McSheffrey (2002)
- The Doryman (2003), ISBN 1-894463-40-4
- Tsunami: The Newfoundland Tidal Wave Disaster (2004) ISBN 1-894463-63-3
- Rogues and Heroes (2005) (co-authored with Paul Butler)
- Domino: The Eskimo Coast Disaster (2006)
- The Alphabet Fleet: The Pride of the Newfoundland Coastal Service (2007)
- Spirit and Dust: Meditations for Women with Depression (2009)
- Sheilagh's Brush (2010)
- Unchained Man: The Arctic Life and Times of Captain Robert Abram Bartlett, Boulder Publications (2018)

With Yale Belanger, Ways of Knowing:An Introduction to Indigenous Studies in Canada, 4th Ed. Toronto: Nelson Education Ltd. https://www.ulethbridge.ca/directory/person/belayd <ref>
