= Mumia Abu-Jamal: A Case For Reasonable Doubt? =

1996 documentary film

- Directed by: John Edginton
- Written by: John Edginton
- Produced by: John Edginton; Sarah Teale
- Starring: Mumia Abu-Jamal
- Cinematography: Bestor Cram
- Edited by: Ray Frawley
- Distributed by: Otmoor Productions
- Release date: 1996
- Running time: 57 and 74 minutes
- Language: English
- Budget: unknown

Mumia Abu-Jamal: A Case for Reasonable Doubt? is a documentary film about journalist Mumia Abu-Jamal and his trial for murder of a Philadelphia police officer, produced and directed by John Edginton. There are two versions, both produced by Otmoor Productions. The first version was 57 minutes long and aired in 1996 by HBO.

The second version, which was 74 minutes long, contained additional interview material, most notably with the witness Veronica Jones, an ex-prostitute. This longer version was not executive-produced by HBO. It was released in a small number of US cinemas and on DVD and is now available for streaming

== Synopsis ==
The film is a documentary covering the trial and case of Mumia Abu-Jamal, a journalist convicted in 1982 of the murder of a Philadelphia police officer and sentenced to death. He has written commentaries and a book while on death row. HBO aired it in collaboration with Court TV, which followed it with a discussion about the film and case by a panel.

== Reception ==
The New York Times said the documentary constructed a strong case for there being reasonable doubt that Abu-Jamal got justice in his trial. It noted issues of race and a history of police corruption in Philadelphia, combined with numerous pro-prosecutor rulings by the judge.

== Awards ==
- 1998 – Won the Golden Conch award and the Indian Critics Award in the category Best Film of Above 40 Minutes Duration in Non-Fiction Category to John Edginton.
- 1997 – Nominated for the CableACE award in the category of Historical Documentary Special or Series. The nominees were Sheila Nevins (executive producer), John Edginton (producer/director), Sarah Teale (co-producer) and Nancy Abraham (associate producer).
- 1997 - National Educational Media Network, USA, won the Golden Apple Award.

== See also ==
- In Prison My Whole Life
