= Prison Radio =

Prison Radio is an independent San Francisco–based multimedia production studio that produces commentary and presents artwork of incarcerated people in the United States. The studio has been on air since 2010 and is a collaborative effort with those who are incarcerated. It produces commentaries of several prisoners described as political prisoners as well as radio broadcasts examining core issues of the carceral system. Multiple radio stations across the United States broadcast these commentaries. The project's aims to analyze the prison-industrial complex and illustrating "the perspectives and the intrinsic human worth of the more than 7.1 million people under correctional control in the U.S".
