= Mumia Abu-Jamal =

American incarcerated activist (born 1954)

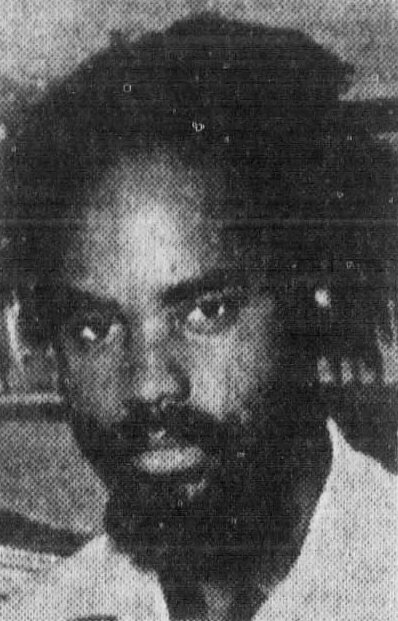
- Abu-Jamal c. 1980
- Born: Wesley Cook; April 24, 1954 (age 72); Philadelphia, Pennsylvania, U.S.
- Occupations: Activist; journalist; author
- Spouses: Biba (c. 1973, div.); Marilyn (1977 – c. 1980, div.); Wadiya (1981–2022, her death)
- Children: 8
- Status: Incarcerated
- Conviction: First degree murder
- Trial: Commonwealth v. Abu-Jamal
- Penalty: Death; commuted to life imprisonment

Mumia Abu-Jamal (born Wesley Cook; April 24, 1954) is an American political activist, journalist and author who was convicted of murder and sentenced to death in 1982 for the 1981 murder of Philadelphia police officer Daniel Faulkner. While on death row, he wrote and commented on the criminal justice system in the United States. After numerous appeals, his death sentence was overturned by a federal court. In 2011, the prosecution agreed to a sentence of life imprisonment without parole. He entered the general prison population early the following year.

Beginning at the age of 14 in 1968, Abu-Jamal became involved with the Black Panther Party and was a member until October 1970, leaving the party at age 16. After leaving, he completed his high school education, and later became a radio reporter. He eventually served as president of the Philadelphia Association of Black Journalists (1978–1980). He supported MOVE, a Philadelphia-based organization, and covered the 1978 confrontation in which one police officer was killed. The MOVE Nine were the members who were arrested and convicted of murder in that case.

Since 1982, the murder trial of Abu-Jamal has been seriously criticized for constitutional failings; some have claimed that he is innocent, and many opposed his death sentence. The Faulkner family, politicians, and other groups involved with law enforcement, state and city governments argue that Abu-Jamal's trial was fair, his guilt beyond question, and his death sentence justified.

When his death sentence was overturned by a federal court in 2001, he was described as "perhaps the world's best-known death-row inmate" by The New York Times. During his imprisonment, Abu-Jamal has published books and commentaries on social and political issues; his first book was Live from Death Row (1995).

== Early life and activism ==
Abu-Jamal was born Wesley Cook in Philadelphia, Pennsylvania, where he grew up. He has a younger brother named William. They attended local public schools. In 1968, a high school teacher, a Kenyan man instructing a class on African cultures, encouraged the students to take African or Arabic names for classroom use; he gave Cook the name "Mumia". According to Abu-Jamal, "Mumia" means "Prince" and was the name of several Kenyan anti-colonial African nationalists who fought in the Mau Mau uprising before Kenyan independence.

=== Involvement with the Black Panthers ===
Abu-Jamal has described being "kicked ... into the Black Panther Party" as a teenager of 14, after suffering a beating from "white racists" and a policeman for trying to disrupt a 1968 rally for Independent candidate George Wallace, former governor of Alabama, who was running on a platform defending racial segregation and opposing federal civil rights legislation. From then, he helped form the Philadelphia branch of the Black Panther Party with Defense Captain Reggie Schell, and other Panthers. He was appointed as the chapter's "Lieutenant of Information," responsible for writing information and news communications. In an interview in the early years, Abu-Jamal quoted Mao Zedong, saying, "Political power grows out of the barrel of a gun". That same year, he dropped out of Benjamin Franklin High School and began living at the branch's headquarters.

He spent late 1969 in New York City and early 1970 in Oakland, living and working with BPP colleagues in those cities; the party's headquarters were based in Oakland. He was a party member from May 1969 until October 1970. During this period, he was subject to surveillance as part of the FBI's COINTELPRO program, which the Church Committee later found involved illegal and unconstitutional activities, with which the Philadelphia police cooperated. The FBI was working to infiltrate black radical groups and disrupt them by creating internal dissent.

=== Return to education ===
After leaving the Panthers, Abu-Jamal returned as a student to his former high school. He was suspended for distributing literature calling for "black revolutionary student power". He led unsuccessful protests to change the school name to Malcolm X High, to honor the major African-American leader who had been killed in New York by political opponents.

After attaining his GED, Abu-Jamal studied briefly at Goddard College in rural Vermont. He returned to Philadelphia.

== Marriages and family ==
Cook adopted the surname Abu-Jamal ("father of Jamal" in Arabic, a type of name known as a kunya) after the birth of his first child, son Jamal, on July 18, 1971. He married Jamal's mother Biba in 1973, but they did not stay together long. Their daughter, Lateefa, was born shortly after the wedding. The couple divorced.

In 1977, Abu-Jamal married again, to his second wife, Marilyn (known as "Peachie"). Their son, Mazi, was born in early 1978. By 1981, Abu-Jamal had divorced Peachie and had married his third (and last) wife, Wadiya. They were married for over 40 years, until she died unexpectedly on December 27, 2022.

== Radio journalism career ==
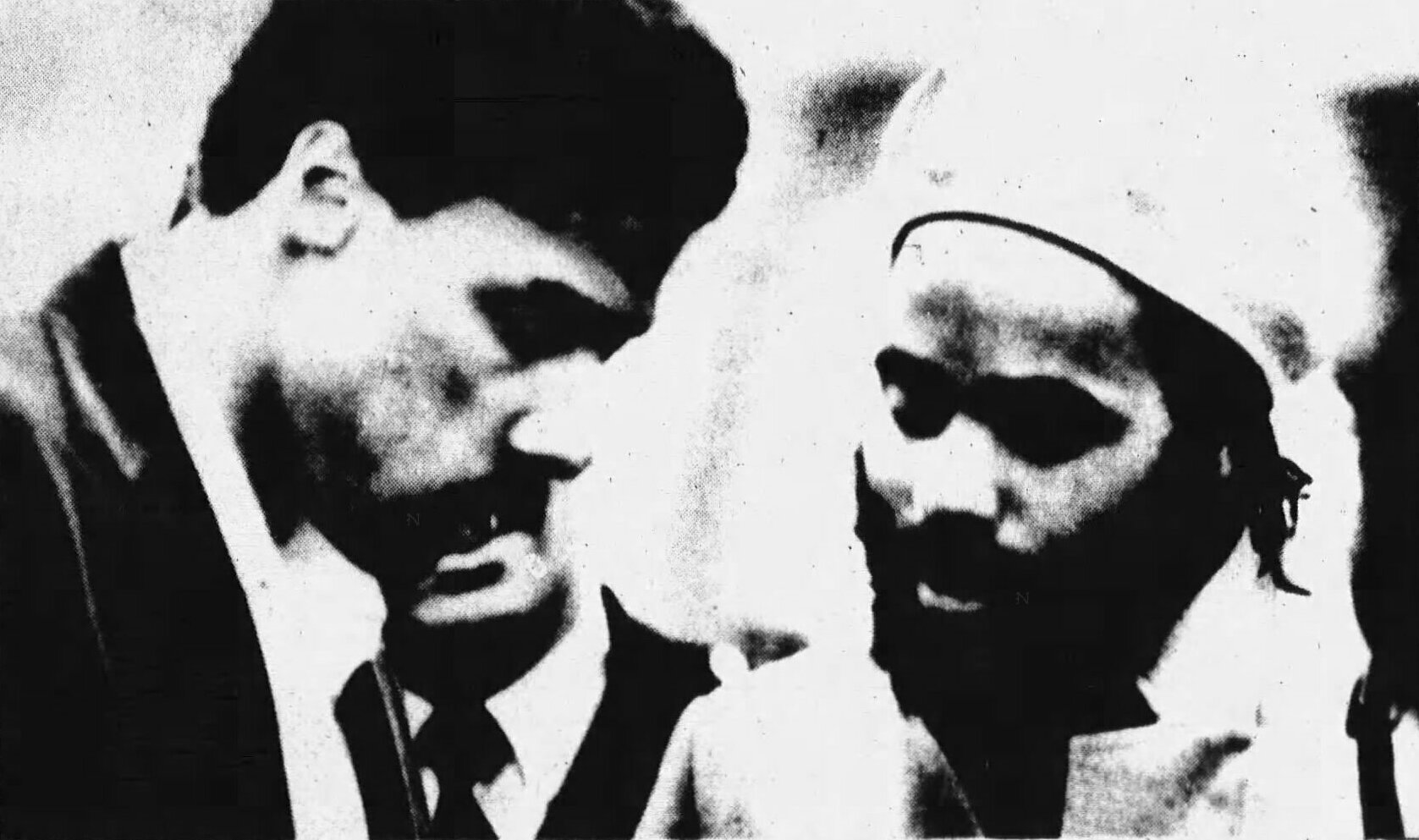
Abu-Jamal (right), then a reporter for WHYY-TV, interviewing Julius Erving of the Philadelphia 76ers in 1980

By 1975, Abu-Jamal was working in radio newscasting, first at Temple University's WRTI and then at commercial enterprises. In 1975, he was employed at radio station WHAT, and he became host of a weekly feature program at WCAU-FM in 1978. He also worked for brief periods at radio station WPEN. He became active in the local chapter of the Marijuana Users Association of America.

From 1979 to 1981, he worked at National Public Radio (NPR) affiliate WHYY. The management asked him to resign, saying that he did not maintain a sufficiently objective approach in his presentation of news. As a radio journalist, Abu-Jamal was renowned for identifying with and covering the MOVE anarcho-primitivist commune in West Philadelphia's Powelton Village neighborhood. He reported on the 1979–80 trial of the "MOVE Nine", who were convicted of the murder of police officer James Ramp. Abu-Jamal had several high-profile interviews, including with Julius Erving, Bob Marley, and Alex Haley. He was elected president of the Philadelphia Association of Black Journalists.

Before joining MOVE, Abu-Jamal reported on the organization. When he joined MOVE, he said it was because of his love of the people in the organization. Thinking back on it later, he said he "was probably enraged as well".

In December 1981, Abu-Jamal was working as a taxicab driver in Philadelphia two nights a week to supplement his income. He had been working part-time as a reporter for WDAS, then an African American oriented and minority-owned radio station.

== Traffic stop and murder of officer Faulkner ==
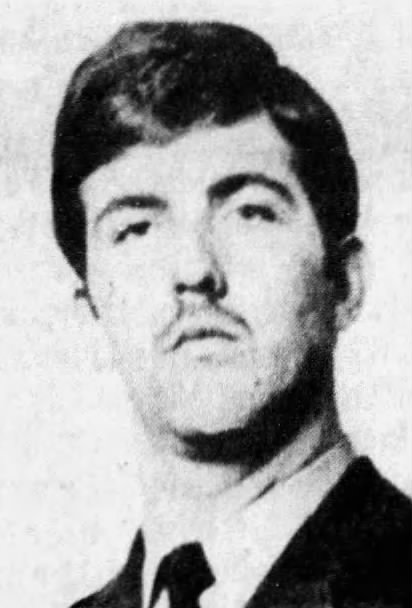
Philadelphia Police Department officer Daniel Faulkner

At 3:55 am on December 9, 1981, in Philadelphia, close to the intersection at 13th and Locust Streets, Philadelphia Police Department officer Daniel Faulkner conducted a traffic stop on a vehicle belonging to and driven by William Cook, Abu-Jamal's younger brother. Faulkner and Cook became engaged in a physical confrontation. Driving his cab in the vicinity, Abu-Jamal observed the altercation, parked, and ran across the street toward Cook's car. Faulkner was shot in the back and face. He shot Abu-Jamal in the stomach. Faulkner died at the scene from the gunshot to his head.

=== Arrest and trial ===
Police arrived and arrested Abu-Jamal, who was found to be wearing a shoulder holster. His revolver, which had five spent cartridges, was beside him. He was taken directly from the scene of the shooting to Thomas Jefferson University Hospital, where he received treatment for his wound. He was next taken to Police Headquarters, where he was charged and held for trial in the first-degree murder of Officer Faulkner.

=== Prosecution case at trial ===
The prosecution presented four witnesses to the court about the shootings. Robert Chobert, a cab driver who testified he was parked behind Faulkner, identified Abu-Jamal as the shooter. Cynthia White testified that Abu-Jamal emerged from a nearby parking lot and shot Faulkner. Michael Scanlan, a motorist, testified that from two car lengths away he saw a man matching Abu-Jamal's description run across the street from a parking lot and shoot Faulkner. Albert Magilton testified to seeing Faulkner pull over Cook's car. As Abu-Jamal started to cross the street toward them, Magilton turned away and did not see what happened next.

The prosecution presented two witnesses from the hospital where Abu-Jamal was treated. Hospital security guard Priscilla Durham and police officer Garry Bell testified that Abu-Jamal said in the hospital, "I shot the motherfucker, and I hope the motherfucker dies."

A .38 caliber Charter Arms revolver, belonging to Abu-Jamal, with five spent cartridges, was retrieved beside him at the scene. He was wearing a shoulder holster. Anthony Paul, the Supervisor of the Philadelphia Police Department's firearms identification unit, testified at trial that the cartridge cases and rifling characteristics of the weapon were consistent with bullet fragments taken from Faulkner's body. Tests to confirm that Abu-Jamal had handled and fired the weapon were not performed. Contact with arresting police and other surfaces at the scene could have compromised the forensic value of such tests.

=== Defense case at trial ===
The defense maintained that Abu-Jamal was innocent, and that the prosecution witnesses were unreliable. The defense presented nine character witnesses, including poet Sonia Sanchez, who testified that Abu-Jamal was "viewed by the black community as a creative, articulate, peaceful, genial man". Another defense witness, Dessie Hightower, testified that he saw a man running along the street shortly after the shooting, although he did not see the shooting itself. His testimony contributed to the development of a "running man theory", based on the possibility that a "running man" may have been the shooter. Veronica Jones also testified for the defense, but she did not testify to having seen another man. Other potential defense witnesses refused to appear in court. Abu-Jamal did not testify in his own defense, nor did his brother, William Cook. Cook had repeatedly told investigators at the crime scene: "I ain't got nothing to do with this!"

=== Verdict and sentence ===
After three hours of deliberations, the jury presented a unanimous guilty verdict.

In the sentencing phase of the trial, Abu-Jamal read to the jury from a prepared statement. He was cross-examined about issues relevant to the assessment of his character by Joseph McGill, the prosecuting attorney.

In his statement, Abu-Jamal criticized his attorney as a "legal trained lawyer", who was imposed on him against his will and who "knew he was inadequate to the task and chose to follow the directions of this black-robed conspirator [referring to the judge], Albert Sabo, even if it meant ignoring my directions." He claimed that his rights had been "deceitfully stolen" from him by Sabo, particularly focusing on the denial of his request to receive defense assistance from John Africa, who was not an attorney, and being prevented from proceeding pro se. He quoted remarks of John Africa, and said:

Does it matter whether a white man is charged with killing a black man or a black man is charged with killing a white man? As for justice when the prosecutor represents the Commonwealth the Judge represents the Commonwealth and the court-appointed lawyer is paid and supported by the Commonwealth, who follows the wishes of the defendant, the man charged with the crime? If the court-appointed lawyer ignores, or goes against the wishes of the man he is charged with representing, whose wishes does he follow? Who does he truly represent or work for? ... I am innocent of these charges that I have been charged of and convicted of and despite the connivance of Sabo, McGill and Jackson to deny me my so-called rights to represent myself, to assistance of my choice, to personally select a jury who is totally of my peers, to cross-examine witnesses, and to make both opening and closing arguments, I am still innocent of these charges.

Abu-Jamal was sentenced to death by the unanimous decision of the jury.

Amnesty International has objected to the introduction by the prosecution at the time of his sentencing of statements from when he was an activist as a youth. It also protested the politicization of the trial, noting that there was documented recent history in Philadelphia of police abuse and corruption, including fabricated evidence and use of excessive force. Amnesty International concluded "that the proceedings used to convict and sentence Mumia Abu-Jamal to death were in violation of minimum international standards that govern fair trial procedures and the use of the death penalty".

== Appeals and review ==
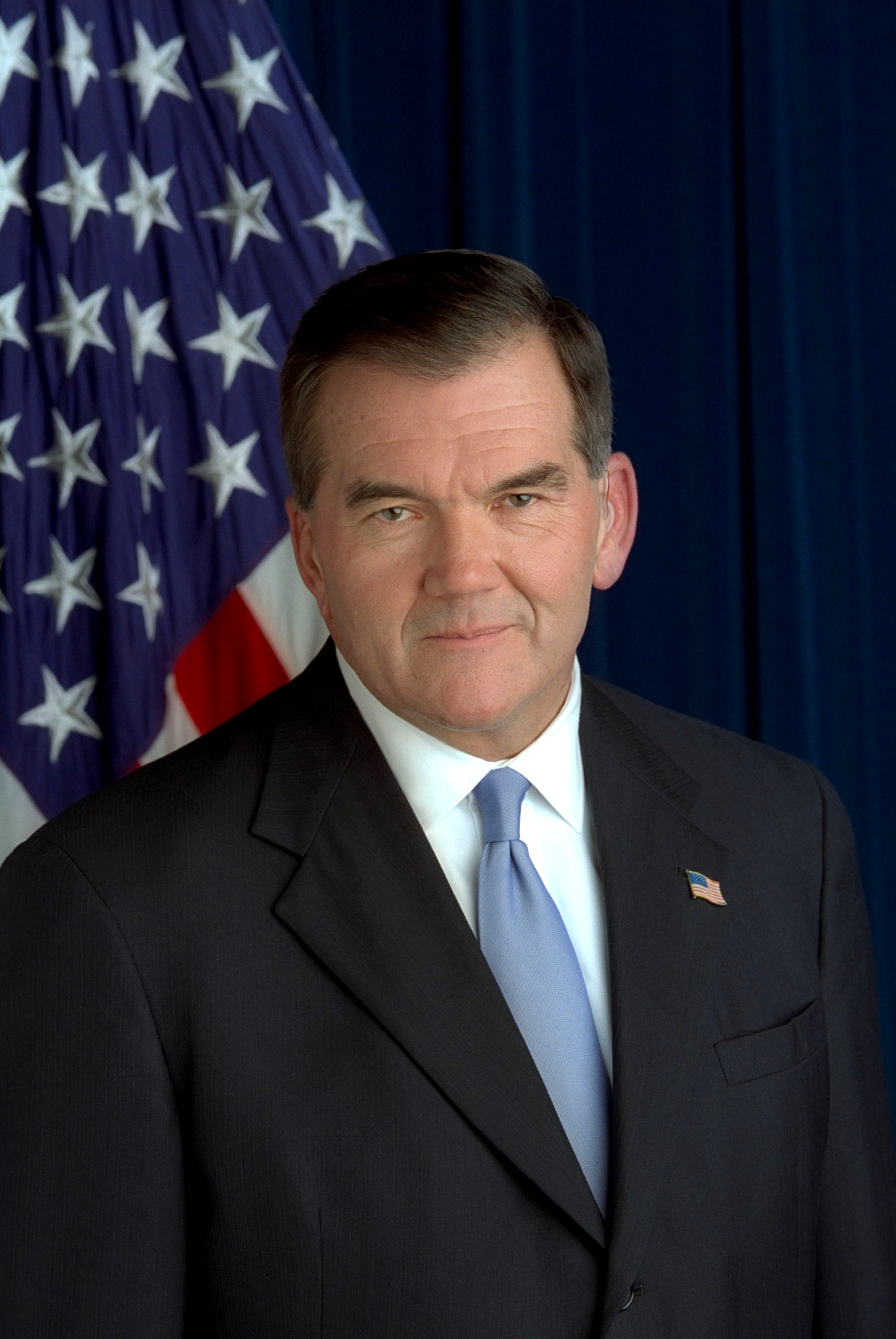
Governor of Pennsylvania Tom Ridge, who signed Abu-Jamal's death warrant on June 1, 1995

=== State appeals ===
The Supreme Court of Pennsylvania on March 6, 1989, heard and rejected a direct appeal of his conviction. It subsequently denied rehearing. The Supreme Court of the United States denied his petition for writ of certiorari on October 1, 1990, and denied his petition for rehearing twice up to June 10, 1991.

On June 1, 1995, Abu-Jamal's death warrant was signed by Pennsylvania Governor Tom Ridge. Its execution was suspended while Abu-Jamal pursued state post-conviction review. At the post-conviction review hearings, new witnesses were called. William "Dales" Singletary testified that he saw the shooting, and that the gunman was the passenger in Cook's car. Singletary's account contained discrepancies which rendered it "not credible" in the opinion of the court.

The six judges of the Supreme Court of Pennsylvania ruled unanimously that all issues raised by Abu-Jamal, including the claim of ineffective assistance of counsel, were without merit. The Supreme Court of the United States denied a petition for certiorari against that decision on October 4, 1999, enabling Ridge to sign a second death warrant on October 13, 1999. Its execution was stayed as Abu-Jamal began to seek federal habeas corpus review.

In 1999, Arnold Beverly claimed that he and an unnamed assailant, not Mumia Abu-Jamal, shot Daniel Faulkner as part of a contract killing because Faulkner was interfering with graft and payoff to corrupt police. As Abu-Jamal's defense team prepared another appeal in 2001, they were divided over use of the Beverly affidavit. Some thought it usable and others rejected Beverly's story as "not credible".

Private investigator George Newman claimed in 2001 that Chobert had recanted his testimony. Commentators noted that police and news photographs of the crime scene did not show Chobert's taxi, and that Cynthia White, the only witness at the original trial to testify to seeing the taxi, had previously provided crime scene descriptions that omitted it. Cynthia White was declared dead by the state of New Jersey in 1992, but Pamela Jenkins claimed that she saw White alive as late as 1997. The Free Mumia Coalition has claimed that White was a police informant and that she falsified her testimony against Abu-Jamal.

Kenneth Pate, who was imprisoned with Abu-Jamal on other charges, has since claimed that his step-sister Priscilla Durham, a hospital security guard, admitted later she had not heard the "hospital confession" to which she had testified at trial. The hospital doctors said that Abu-Jamal was "on the verge of fainting" when brought in, and they did not hear any such confession.

In 2008, the Supreme Court of Pennsylvania rejected a further request from Abu-Jamal for a hearing into claims that the trial witnesses perjured themselves, on the grounds that he had waited too long before filing the appeal.

On March 26, 2012, the Supreme Court of Pennsylvania rejected his appeal for retrial. His defense had asserted, based on a 2009 report by the National Academy of Sciences, that forensic evidence presented by the prosecution and accepted into evidence in the original trial was unreliable. This was reported as Abu-Jamal's last legal appeal.

On April 30, 2018, the Pennsylvania Supreme Court ruled that Abu-Jamal would not be immediately granted another appeal and that the proceedings had to continue until August 30 of that year. The defense argued that former Pennsylvania Supreme Court Chief justice Ronald D. Castille should have recused himself from the 2012 appeals decision after his involvement as Philadelphia District Attorney (DA) in the 1989 appeal. Both sides of the 2018 proceedings repeatedly cited a 1990 letter sent by Castille to then-Governor Bob Casey, urging Casey to sign the execution warrants of those convicted of murdering police. This letter, demanding Casey send "a clear and dramatic message to all cop killers," was claimed as one of many reasons to suspect Castille's bias in the case. Philadelphia's current DA Larry Krasner stated he could not find any document supporting the defense's claim. On August 30, 2018, the proceedings to determine another appeal were once again extended and a ruling on the matter was delayed for at least 60 more days. In December 2018 the court reinstated Abu-Jamal's appeal rights and gave him another chance to argue his case before the state Supreme Court, finding that Castille should have recused himself from the appeal.

In April 2019, Krasner agreed to drop his opposition to a new appeal effort for Abu-Jamal, thus paving the way for a new hearing. In March 2023, Philadelphia-based Common Pleas Court Judge Lucretia Clemons would block this latest appeal effort.

=== Federal District Court 2001 ruling ===
The Free Mumia Coalition published statements by William Cook and his brother Abu-Jamal in the spring of 2001. Cook, who had been stopped by the police officer, had not made any statement before April 29, 2001, and did not testify at his brother's trial. In 2001 he said that he had not seen who had shot Faulkner. Abu-Jamal did not make any public statements about Faulkner's murder until May 4, 2001. In his version of events, he claimed that he was sitting in his cab across the street when he heard shouting, saw a police vehicle, and heard the sound of gunshots. Upon seeing his brother appearing disoriented across the street, Abu-Jamal ran to him from the parking lot and was shot by a police officer.

In 2001, Judge William H. Yohn, Jr. of the United States District Court for the Eastern District of Pennsylvania upheld the conviction, saying that Abu-Jamal did not have the right to a new trial. He vacated the sentence of death on December 18, 2001, citing irregularities in the penalty phase of the trial and the original process of sentencing. He said that "the jury instructions and verdict sheet in this case involved an unreasonable application of federal law. The charge and verdict form created a reasonable likelihood that the jury believed it was precluded from considering any mitigating circumstance that had not been found unanimously to exist." He ordered the State of Pennsylvania to commence new sentencing proceedings within 180 days, and ruled unconstitutional the requirement that a jury be unanimous in its finding of circumstances mitigating against a sentence of death.

Eliot Grossman and Marlene Kamish, attorneys for Abu-Jamal, criticized the ruling on the grounds that it denied the possibility of a trial de novo, at which they could introduce evidence that their client had been framed. Prosecutors also criticized the ruling. Officer Faulkner's widow Maureen said the judgment would allow Abu-Jamal, whom she described as a "remorseless, hate-filled killer", to "be permitted to enjoy the pleasures that come from simply being alive". Both parties appealed.

=== Federal appeal and review ===
On December 6, 2005, the Third Circuit Court of Appeals admitted four issues for appeal of the ruling of the District Court:

1. in relation to sentencing, whether the jury verdict form had been flawed and the judge's instructions to the jury had been confusing;
2. in relation to conviction and sentencing, whether racial bias in jury selection existed to an extent tending to produce an inherently biased jury and therefore an unfair trial (the Batson claim);
3. in relation to conviction, whether the prosecutor improperly attempted to reduce jurors' sense of responsibility by telling them that a guilty verdict would be subsequently vetted and subject to appeal; and
4. in relation to post-conviction review hearings in 1995–1996, whether the presiding judge, who had also presided at the trial, demonstrated unacceptable bias in his conduct.

The Third Circuit Court heard oral arguments in the appeals on May 17, 2007, at the United States Courthouse in Philadelphia. The appeal panel consisted of Chief Judge Anthony Joseph Scirica, Judge Thomas Ambro, and Judge Robert Cowen. The Commonwealth of Pennsylvania sought to reinstate the sentence of death, on the basis that Yohn's ruling was flawed, as he should have deferred to the Pennsylvania Supreme Court which had already ruled on the issue of sentencing. The prosecution said that the Batson claim was invalid because Abu-Jamal made no complaints during the original jury selection.

The resulting jury was racially mixed, with two blacks and ten whites at the time of the unanimous conviction, but defense counsel told the Third Circuit Court that Abu-Jamal did not get a fair trial because the jury was racially biased, misinformed, and the judge was a racist. He noted that the prosecution used eleven out of fourteen peremptory challenges to eliminate prospective black jurors. Terri Maurer-Carter, a former Philadelphia court stenographer, stated in a 2001 affidavit that she overheard Judge Sabo say "Yeah, and I'm going to help them fry the nigger," in the course of a conversation with three people present regarding Abu-Jamal's case. Sabo denied having made any such comment.

On March 27, 2008, the three-judge panel issued a majority 2–1 opinion upholding Yohn's 2001 opinion but rejecting the bias and Batson claims, with Judge Ambro dissenting on the Batson issue. On July 22, 2008, Abu-Jamal's formal petition seeking reconsideration of the decision by the full Third Circuit panel of 12 judges was denied. On April 6, 2009, the United States Supreme Court refused to hear Abu-Jamal's appeal, allowing his conviction to stand.

On January 19, 2010, the Supreme Court ordered the appeals court to reconsider its decision to rescind the death penalty. The same three-judge panel convened in Philadelphia on November 9, 2010, to hear oral argument. On April 26, 2011, the Third Circuit Court of Appeals reaffirmed its prior decision to vacate the death sentence on the grounds that the jury instructions and verdict form were ambiguous and confusing. The Supreme Court declined to hear the case in October.

=== Death penalty dropped ===
On December 7, 2011, District Attorney of Philadelphia R. Seth Williams announced that prosecutors, with the support of the victim's family, would no longer seek the death penalty for Abu-Jamal and would accept a sentence of life imprisonment without parole. This sentence was reaffirmed by the Superior Court of Pennsylvania on July 9, 2013.

After the press conference on the sentence, widow Maureen Faulkner said that she did not want to relive the trauma of another trial. She understood that it would be extremely difficult to present the case against Abu-Jamal again, after the passage of 30 years and the deaths of several key witnesses. She also reiterated her belief that Abu-Jamal will be punished further after death.

== Life as a prisoner ==
In 1991, Abu-Jamal published an essay in the Yale Law Journal on the death penalty and his death row experience. In May 1994, he was engaged by NPR's All Things Considered program to deliver a series of monthly three-minute commentaries on crime and punishment. The broadcast plans and commercial arrangement were canceled following condemnations from, among others, the Fraternal Order of Police and Senate Minority Leader Bob Dole. Abu-Jamal sued NPR for not airing his work, but a federal judge dismissed the suit. His commentaries were later published in May 1995 as part of his first book, Live from Death Row.

In January 1996, Abu-Jamal completed a B.A. degree via correspondence classes at Goddard College, which he had first attended for a short time as a young man. Soon after, in May 1996, the now defunct New College of California School of Law presented him with an honorary Doctorate of Law degree "for his struggle to resist the death penalty."

In 1999, Pennsylvania Prison Society volunteer Phillip Bloch claimed Abu-Jamal admitted to him that he murdered Faulkner. According to Bloch, he asked Abu-Jamal whether he regretted killing Faulkner and Abu-Jamal responded that he did. Abu-Jamal accused Bloch of fabricating the confession, producing a handwritten letter allegedly written by Bloch after the date of their conversation in which he expressed his belief in Abu-Jamal's innocence.

Abu-Jamal has been invited as a commencement speaker by a number of colleges and has participated via recordings. In 1999, he was invited to record a keynote address for the graduating class at Evergreen State College in Washington state. The event was protested by some. In 2000, he recorded a commencement address for Antioch College.

On October 5, 2014, he gave the commencement speech at Goddard College, via playback of a recording. As before, the choice of Abu-Jamal was controversial. Ten days later, the Pennsylvania legislature passed an addition to the Crime Victims Act called "Revictimization Relief." The new provision was intended to prevent actions that cause "a temporary or permanent state of mental anguish" to those who have previously been victimized by crime. It was signed by Republican governor Tom Corbett five days later. Commentators suggested that the bill was directed to control Abu-Jamal's journalism, book publication, and public speaking, and that it would be challenged on free speech grounds. The law quickly faced multiple legal challenges from plaintiffs including Abu-Jamal, prison and human rights activists, publishers, and individual reporters. In April 2015, it was ruled unconstitutional and struck down for being overly vague and broad, and for restricting free expression based on content.

With occasional interruptions due to prison disciplinary actions, Abu-Jamal has for many years been a regular commentator on an online broadcast sponsored by Prison Radio. He is also published as a regular columnist for Junge Welt, a Marxist newspaper in Germany. For almost a decade, he taught introductory courses in Georgist economics by correspondence to other prisoners around the world.

Abu-Jamal has written and published numerous books during his imprisonment, including Live From Death Row (1995), a diary of life on Pennsylvania's death row; All Things Censored (2000), a collection of essays examining issues of crime and punishment; and Death Blossoms: Reflections from a Prisoner of Conscience (2003), in which he explores religious themes. His 2004 book We Want Freedom: A Life in the Black Panther Party is a history of the Black Panthers that draws on his own experience and research and discusses the federal government's COINTELPRO program, which worked to infiltrate and disrupt black activist organizations.

In 1995, Abu-Jamal was punished with solitary confinement for engaging in entrepreneurship contrary to prison regulations. Subsequent to the airing of the 1996 HBO documentary Mumia Abu-Jamal: A Case for Reasonable Doubt?, which included footage from visitation interviews conducted with him, the Pennsylvania Department of Corrections banned outsiders from using any recording equipment in state prisons.

In litigation before the U.S. Court of Appeals, in 1998, Abu-Jamal successfully established his right while in prison to write for financial gain. The same litigation also established that the Pennsylvania Department of Corrections had illegally opened his mail in an attempt to establish whether he was earning money by his writing.

When, for a brief time in August 1999, Abu-Jamal began delivering his radio commentaries live on the Pacifica Network's weekday Democracy Now! radio newsmagazine program, prison staff severed the connecting wires of his telephone from their mounting mid-broadcast. He was later allowed to resume his appearances, and hundreds of his broadcasts have since been aired on Pacifica Radio.

Following the overturning of his death sentence, Abu-Jamal was sentenced to life in prison in December 2011. At the end of January 2012, he was shifted from the isolation of death row into the general population at State Correctional Institution – Mahanoy.

In August 2015, Abu-Jamal's attorneys filed suit in the U.S. District Court for the Middle District of Pennsylvania, alleging that he has not received appropriate medical care for his serious health conditions. In April 2021, he tested positive for COVID-19 and was scheduled for heart surgery to relieve blocked coronary arteries.

In 2022, Brown University's John Hay Library acquired Abu-Jamal's personal papers as part of its Voices of Mass Incarceration collecting initiative. According to a Brown University archivist, the Abu-Jamal collection "is the largest and only collection relating to a person who is still incarcerated."

In July 2026, Abu-Jamal petitioned the United Nations Working Group on Arbitrary Detention to condemn his continued imprisonment as a violation of international law, believing such an action would bolster efforts to commute his sentence.

== Popular support and opposition ==
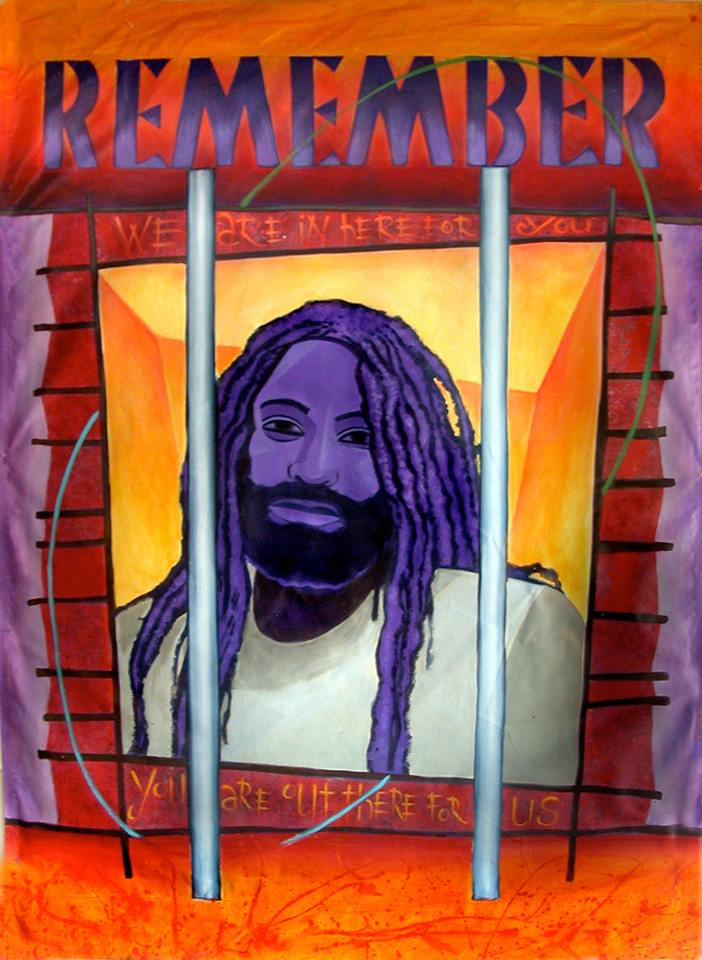
A 1995 banner by American muralist Mike Alewitz

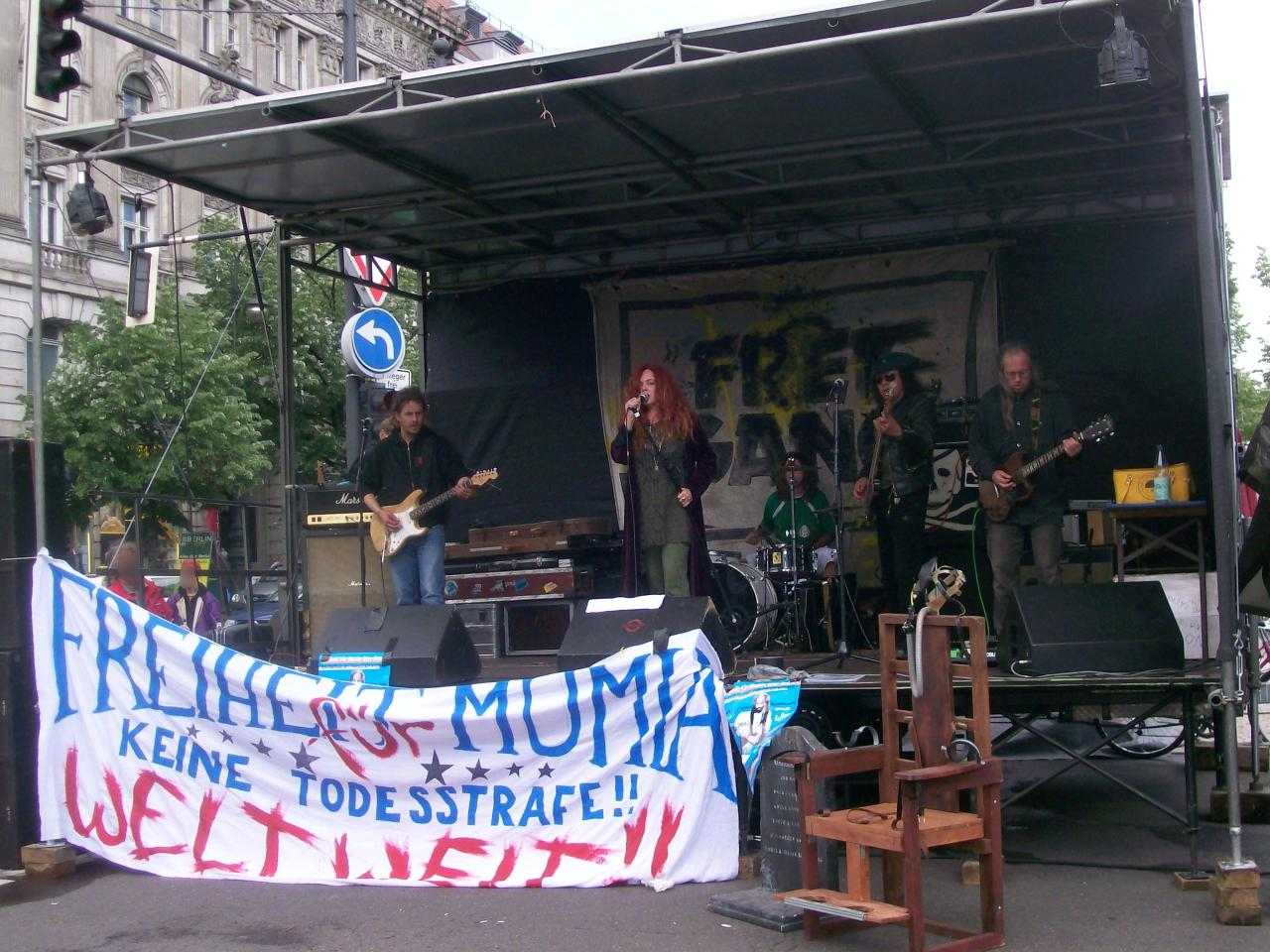
Concert at a Free Mumia demonstration in Germany in 2007

An anti-Abu-Jamal T-shirt sold in Philadelphia

Labor unions, politicians, advocates, educators, the NAACP Legal Defense and Educational Fund, and human rights advocacy organizations such as Human Rights Watch and Amnesty International have expressed concern about the impartiality of the trial of Abu-Jamal. Amnesty International neither takes a position on the guilt or innocence of Abu-Jamal nor classifies him as a political prisoner.

The family of Daniel Faulkner, the Commonwealth of Pennsylvania, the City of Philadelphia, politicians, and the Fraternal Order of Police have continued to support the original trial and sentencing of the journalist. In August 1999, the Fraternal Order of Police called for an economic boycott against all individuals and organizations that support Abu-Jamal. Many such groups operate within the Prison-Industrial Complex, a system which Abu-Jamal has frequently criticized.

Partly based on his own writing, Abu-Jamal and his cause have become widely known internationally, and other groups have classified him as a political prisoner. About 25 cities, including Montreal, Palermo, and Paris, have made him an honorary citizen.

In 2001, he received the sixth biennial Erich Mühsam Prize, named after an anarcho-communist essayist, which recognizes activism in line with that of its namesake. In October 2002, he was made an honorary member of the German political organization Union of Persecutees of the Nazi Regime.

On April 29, 2006, a newly paved road in the Parisian suburb of Saint-Denis was named Rue Mumia Abu-Jamal in his honor. In protest of the street-naming, U.S. Congressman Michael Fitzpatrick and Senator Rick Santorum, both members of the Republican Party of Pennsylvania, introduced resolutions in both Houses of Congress condemning the decision. The House of Representatives voted 368–31 in favor of Fitzpatrick's resolution. In December 2006, the 25th anniversary of the murder, the executive committee of the Republican Party for the 59th Ward of the City of Philadelphia—covering approximately Germantown, Philadelphia—filed two criminal complaints in the French legal system against the city of Paris and the city of Saint-Denis, accusing the municipalities of "glorifying" Abu-Jamal and alleging the offense "apology or denial of crime" in respect of their actions.

In 2007, the widow of Officer Faulkner co-authored a book with Philadelphia radio journalist Michael Smerconish titled Murdered by Mumia: A Life Sentence of Pain, Loss, and Injustice. The book was part memoir of Faulkner's widow and part discussion in which they chronicled Abu-Jamal's trial and discussed evidence for his conviction. They also discussed support for the death penalty.

In early 2014, President Barack Obama nominated Debo Adegbile, a former lawyer for the NAACP Legal Defense Fund, to head the civil rights division of the Justice Department. He had worked on Abu-Jamal's case, and his nomination was rejected by the U.S. Senate on a bipartisan basis because of that.

After Goddard College invited Abu-Jamal to give a recorded commencement speech in 2014 and an outcry by the police union against this, the Revictimization Relief Act was introduced, passed and signed into Pennsylvania law. It allowed victims and prosecutors to sue if a perpetrator causes a "state of mental anguish" by perpetuating "the continuing effect of a crime on the victim." The law was struck down in April 2015 as a vague and overbroad restriction on free speech.

On April 10, 2015, Marylin Zuniga, a teacher at Forest Street Elementary School in Orange, New Jersey, was suspended without pay after asking her students to write cards to Abu-Jamal, who was ill in prison due to complications from diabetes, without approval from the school or parents. Some parents and police leaders denounced her actions. Conversely, some community members, parents, teachers, and professors expressed support for Zuniga and condemned her suspension. Scholars and educators nationwide, including Noam Chomsky, Chris Hedges and Cornel West among others, signed a letter calling for her immediate reinstatement. On May 13, 2015, the Orange Preparatory Academy board voted to dismiss Marylin Zuniga after hearing from her and several of her supporters.

== Written works ==
- Beneath the Mountain: An Anti-Prison Reader, City Lights Publishers (2024), ISBN 9780872869264
- Murder Incorporated - Perfecting Tyranny: Book Three (Empire, Genocide, and Manifest Destiny) (2021), Prison Radio, ISBN 978-1-7346489-1-1, co-authored by Stephen Vittoria
- Murder Incorporated - America's Favorite Pastime : Book Two (Empire, Genocide, and Manifest Destiny) (2019), Prison Radio, ISBN 978-0-9989600-5-0, co-authored by Stephen Vittoria
- Murder Incorporated - Dreaming of Empire: Book One (Empire, Genocide, and Manifest Destiny) (2018), Prison Radio, ISBN 9780998960012, co-authored by Stephen Vittoria
- Have Black Lives Ever Mattered? City Lights Publishers (2017), ISBN 9780872867383
- Writing on the Wall: Selected Prison Writings of Mumia Abu-Jamal, City Lights Publishers (2015), ISBN 978-0872866751
- The Classroom and the Cell: Conversations on Black Life in America, Third World Press (2011), ISBN 978-0883783375
- Jailhouse Lawyers: Prisoners Defending Prisoners v. the U.S.A., City Lights Publishers (2009), ISBN 978-0872864696
- We Want Freedom: A Life in the Black Panther Party, South End Press (2008), ISBN 978-0896087187
- Faith of Our Fathers: An Examination of the Spiritual Life of African and African-American People, Africa World Press (2003), ISBN 978-1592210190
- All Things Censored, Seven Stories Press (2000), ISBN 978-1583220221
- Death Blossoms: Reflections from a Prisoner of Conscience, Plough Publishing House (1997), ISBN 978-0874860863
- Live from Death Row, Harper Perennial (1996), ISBN 978-0380727667

== Representation in popular culture ==
- HBO aired the documentary film Mumia Abu-Jamal: A Case for Reasonable Doubt? in 1996; this 57-minute film about the 1982 murder trial is directed by John Edginton. There are two versions by Edginton, both produced by Otmoor Productions. The second is 72 minutes long and contains additional information by witnesses.
- In 1995 hip hop artist KRS-One together with Channel Live released the track "Free Mumia" on his second solo album KRS-One.
- An album containing spoken word from Abu-Jamal with four tracks by powerviolence band Man Is the Bastard was released in 2002.
- Political hip hop artist Immortal Technique featured Abu-Jamal on his second album Revolutionary Vol. 2.
- The punk band Anti-Flag has a speech from Mumia Abu-Jamal in the intro to their song "The Modern Rome Burning" from their 2008 album The Bright Lights of America. The speech also appears on the end of their preceding track "Vices".
- The rock band Rage Against the Machine mentions Mumia in 2 of their songs—"Guerrilla Radio" and "Voice of the Voiceless"—on their 1999 album The Battle of Los Angeles.
- Alternative hip-hop band Flobots, known for criticizing US politics and calls for action, referenced Abu-Jamal in their song "Same Thing" from their 2007 debut album Fight with Tools. The song mentions many people and topics, and the line that references Abu-Jamal also references Leonard Peltier; it reads "Free Mumia and Leonard Peltier".
- The documentary film In Prison My Whole Life (2008), directed by Marc Evans, and written by Evans and William Francome, explores the life of Abu-Jamal.

== See also ==
- Sundiata Acoli, murdered a New Jersey state trooper in 1974
